= List of mammals of Wisconsin =

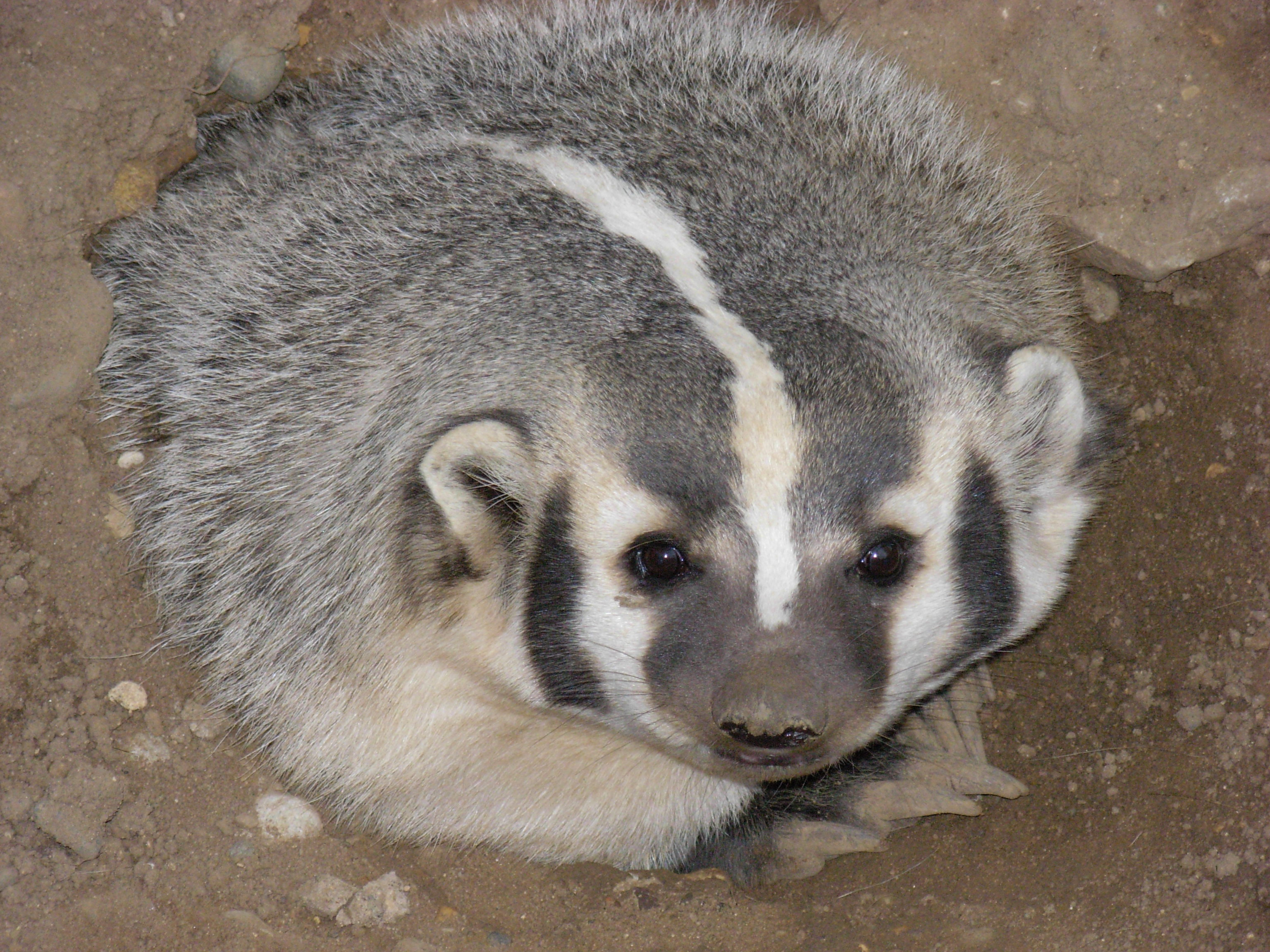
The American badger is the state animal of Wisconsin.

This is a list of mammals native to the U.S. state of Wisconsin.

The following tags are used to highlight each species' conservation status as assessed by the International Union for Conservation of Nature:

EX	Extinct	No reasonable doubt that the last individual has died.
EW	Extinct in the wild	Known only to survive in captivity or as a naturalized populations well outside its previous range.
CR	Critically endangered	The species is in imminent risk of extinction in the wild.
EN	Endangered	The species is facing an extremely high risk of extinction in the wild.
VU	Vulnerable	The species is facing a high risk of extinction in the wild.
NT	Near threatened	The species does not meet any of the criteria that would categorize it as risking extinction but it is likely to do so in the future.
LC	Least concern	There are no current identifiable risks to the species.
DD	Data deficient	There is inadequate information to make an assessment of the risks to this species.

== Opossums ==
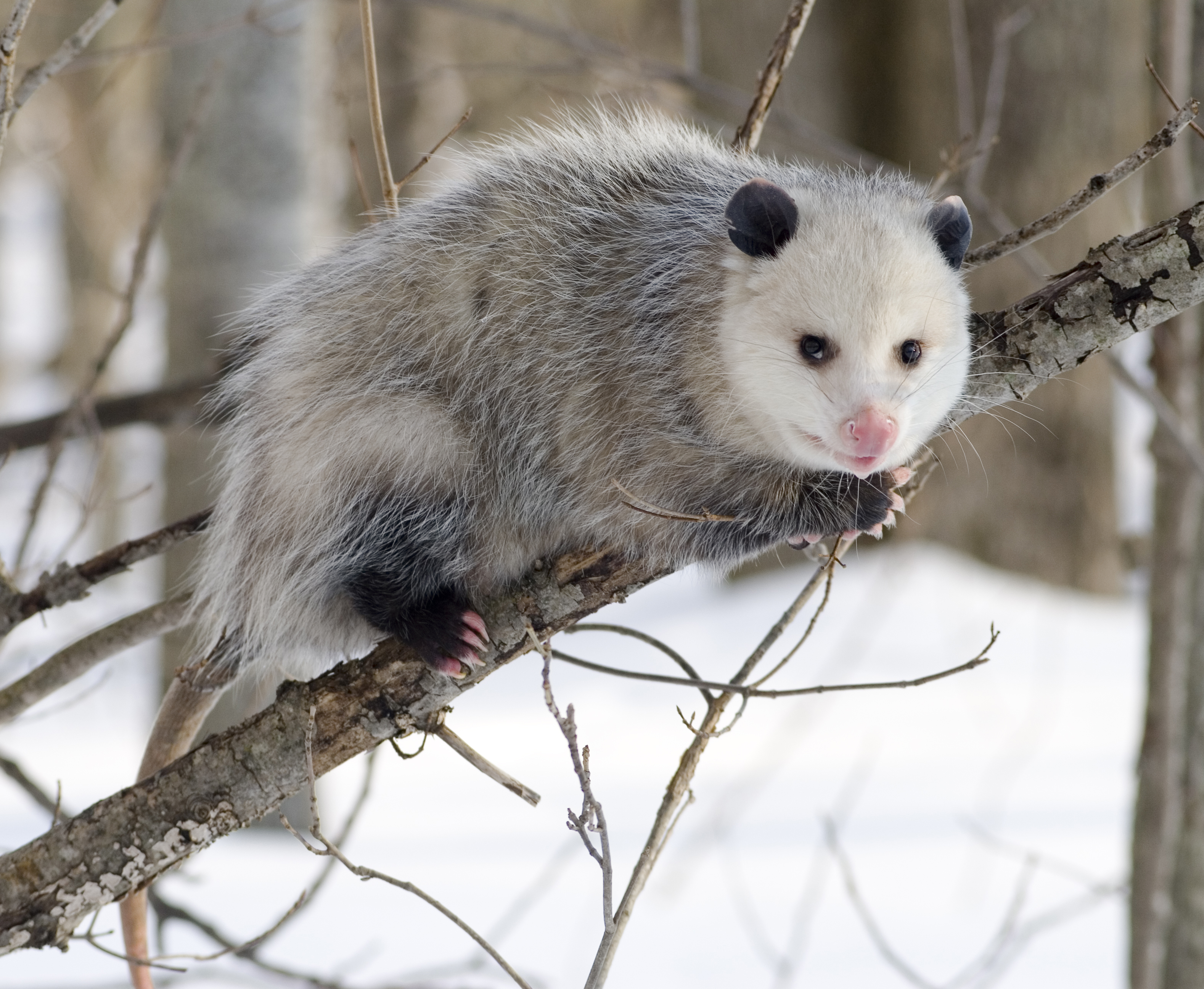
Virginia opossum

- Family Didelphidae (opossums)
  - Genus: Didelphis
    - Virginia opossum, D. virginiana LC

== Insectivores ==
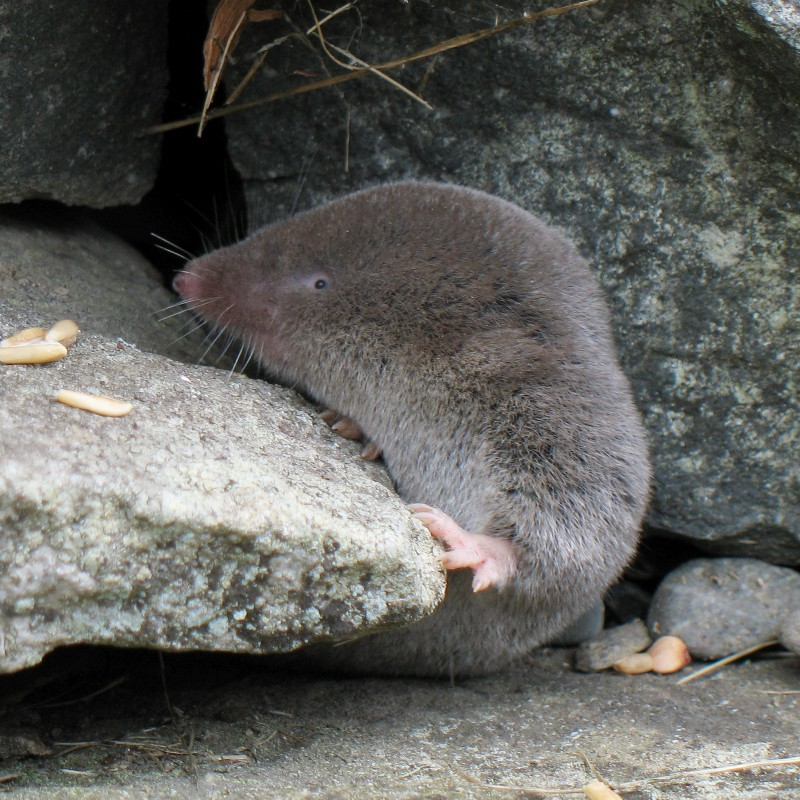
Northern short-tailed shrew

- Family Soricidae (shrews)
  - Genus: Cryptotis
    - North American least shrew, C. parva LC
  - Genus: Blarina
    - Northern short-tailed shrew, B. brevicauda LC
  - Genus: Sorex
    - Arctic shrew, S. arcticus LC
    - Cinereus shrew, S. cinereus LC
    - American pygmy shrew, S. hoyi LC
    - American water shrew, S. palustris LC
- Family Talpidae (moles)
  - Genus: Condylura
    - Star-nosed mole, C. cristata LC
  - Genus: Scalopus
    - Eastern mole, S. aquaticus LC

== Rodents ==
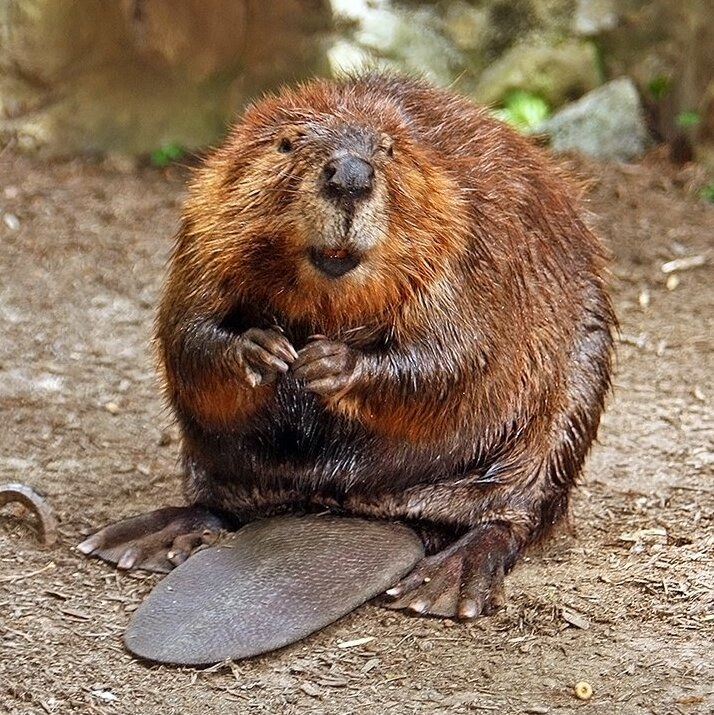
North American beaver

- Family Castoridae (beavers)
  - Genus: Castor
    - North American beaver C. canadensis LC
- Family Cricetidae (New World mice, rats, voles, lemmings, muskrats)
  - Genus: Clethrionomys
    - Southern red-backed vole, C. gapperi LC
  - Genus: Microtus
    - Rock vole, M. chrotorrhinus LC
    - Prairie vole, M. ochrogaster LC
    - Eastern meadow vole, M. pennsylvanicus LC
    - Woodland vole, M. pinetorum LC
  - Genus: Ondatra
    - Muskrat, O. zibethicus LC
  - Genus: Peromyscus
    - White-footed mouse, P. leucopus LC
    - Eastern deer mouse, P. manniculatus LC
  - Genus: Reithrodontomys
    - Western harvest mouse, R. megalotis LC
  - Genus: Synaptomys
    - Southern bog lemming, S. cooperi LC
- Family Dipodidae (jumping mice)
  - Genus: Napaeozapus
    - Woodland jumping mouse, N. insignis LC
  - Genus: Zapus
    - Meadow jumping mouse, Z. hudsonius LC
- Family Erethizontidae (New World porcupines)
  - Genus: Erethizon
    - North American porcupine, E. dorsatum LC
- Family Geomyidae (pocket gophers)
  - Genus: Geomys
    - Plains pocket gopher, G. bursarius LC
- Family Muridae (Old World mice and rats)
  - Genus: Mus
    - House mouse, M. musculus LC (introduced)
  - Genus: Rattus
    - Brown rat, R. norvegicus LC (introduced)
- Family Sciuridae (squirrels)
  - Genus: Glaucomys
    - Northern flying squirrel, G. sabrinus LC
    - Southern flying squirrel, G. volans LC
  - Genus: Ictidomys
    - Thirteen-lined ground squirrel, I. tridecemlineatus LC
  - Genus: Marmota
    - Groundhog, M. morax LC
  - Genus: Neotamias
    - Least chipmunk, N. minimus LC
  - Genus: Poliocitellus
    - Franklin's ground squirrel, P. franklinii LC
  - Genus: Sciurus
    - Eastern gray squirrel, S. carolinensis LC
    - Fox squirrel, S. niger LC
  - Genus: Tamias
    - Eastern chipmunk, T. striatus LC
  - Genus: Tamiasciurus
    - American red squirrel, T. hudsonicus LC

== Lagomorphs ==
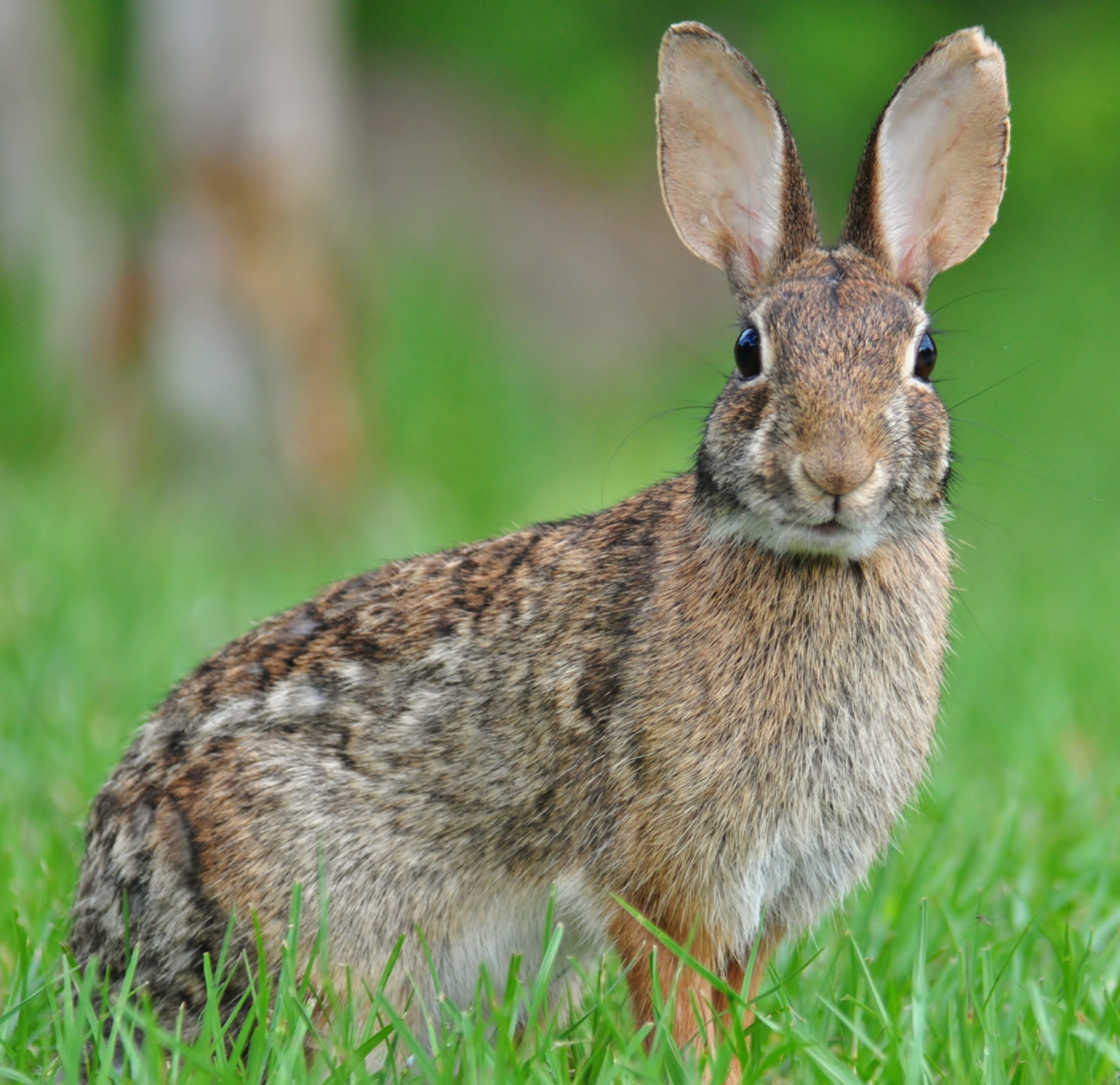
Eastern cottontail

- Family Leporidae (rabbits and hares)
  - Genus: Lepus
    - Snowshoe hare, L. americanus LC
    - White-tailed jackrabbit, L. townsendii LC
  - Genus: Sylvilagus
    - Eastern cottontail, S. floridanus LC

== Bats ==
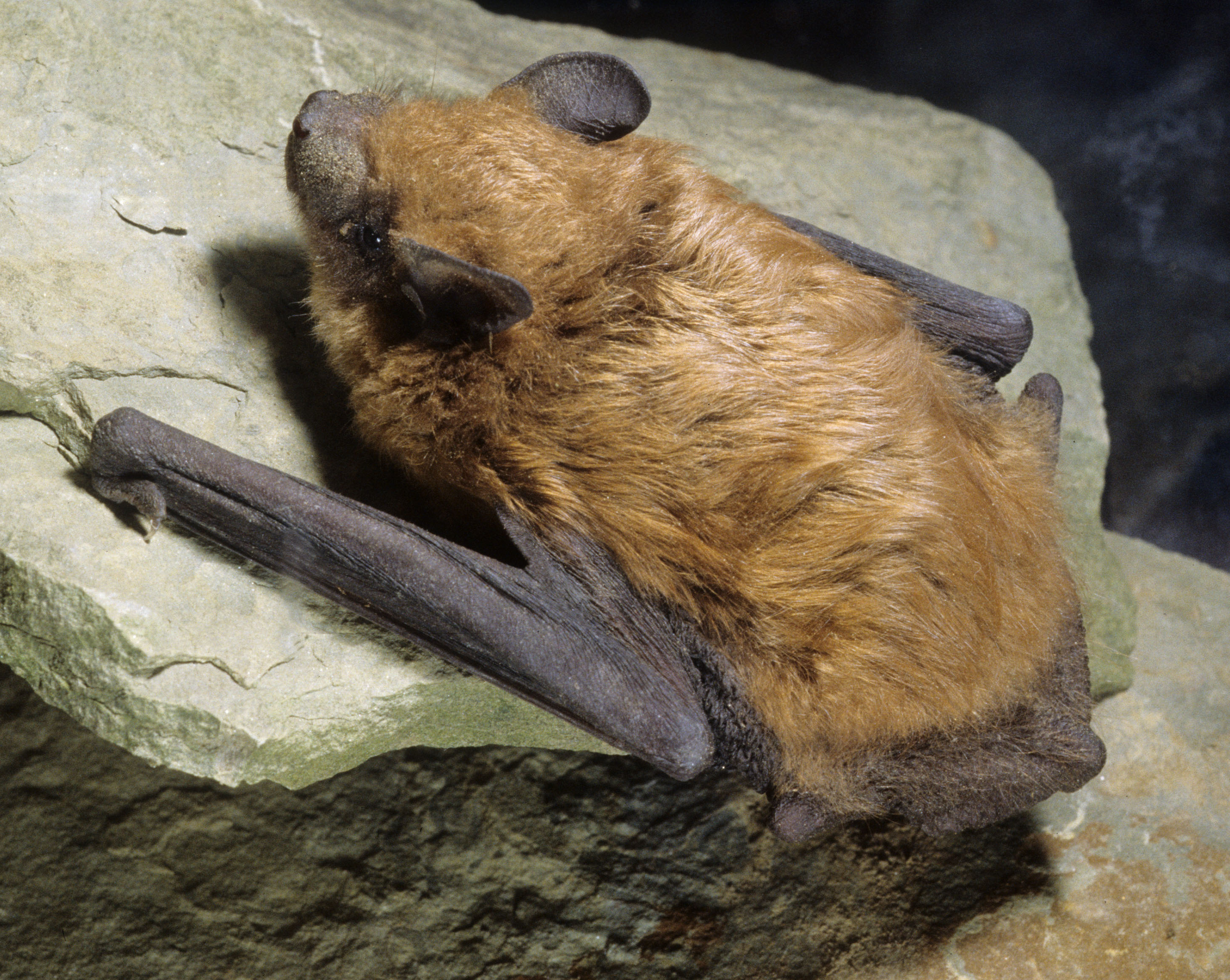
Big brown bat

- Family Vespertilionidae (vesper bats)
  - Genus: Eptesicus
    - Big brown bat, E. fuscus LC
  - Genus: Lasionycteris
    - Silver-haired bat, L. noctivagans LC
  - Genus: Lasiurus
    - Eastern red bat, L. borealis LC
    - Hoary bat, L. cinereus LC
  - Genus: Myotis
    - Northern long-eared bat, M. septentrionalis EN
    - Little brown bat, M. lucifugus EN
    - Indiana bat, M. sodalis NT
  - Genus: Perimyotis
    - Tricolored bat, P. subflavus VU

== Carnivores ==
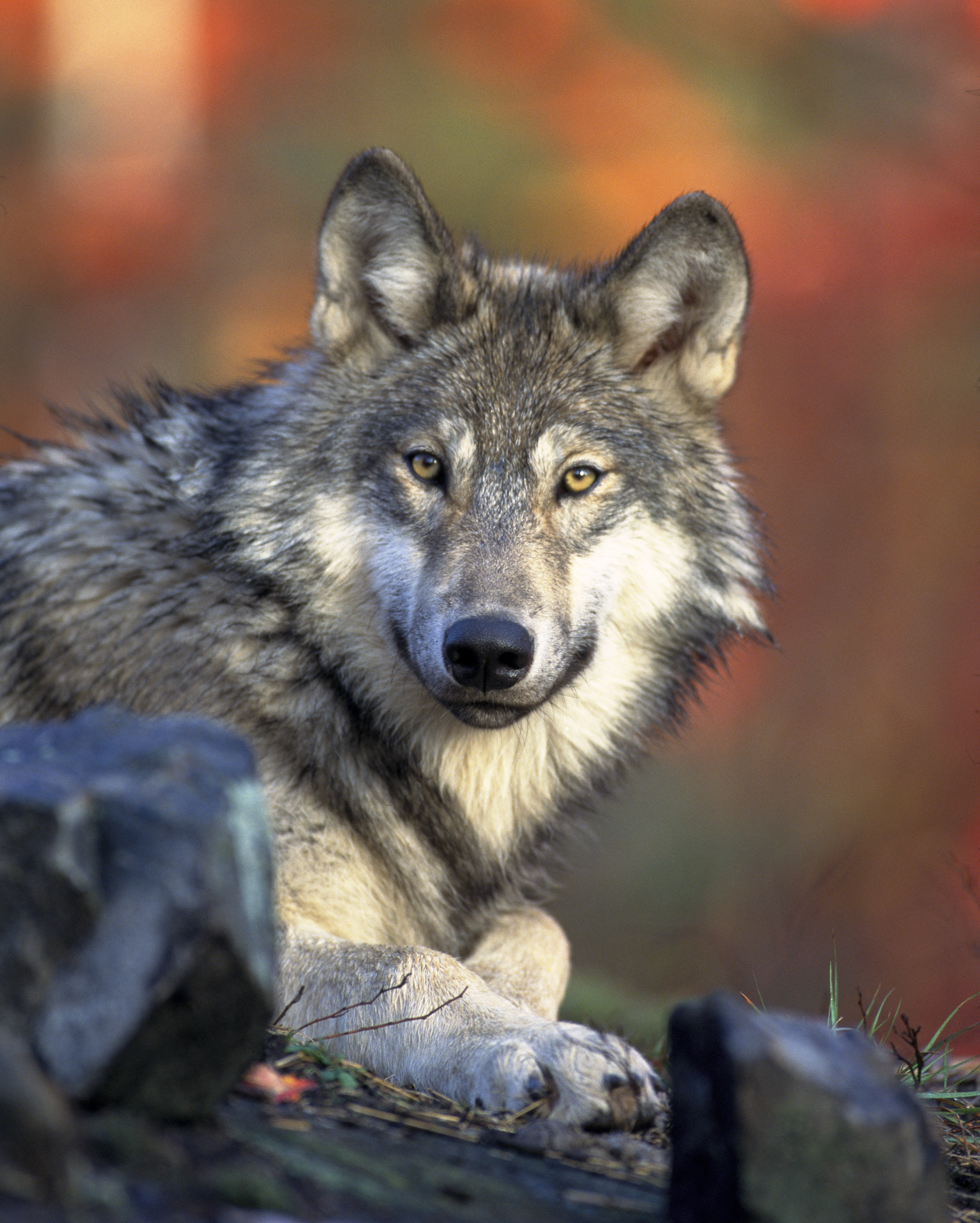
Gray wolf

- Family Canidae (canids)
  - Genus: Canis
    - Coyote, C. latrans LC
    - Gray wolf, C. lupus LC reintroduced
  - Genus: Urocyon
    - Gray fox, U. cinereoargenteus LC
  - Genus: Vulpes
    - Red fox, V. vulpes LC
- Family Felidae (cats)
  - Genus: Lynx
    - Canada lynx, L. canadensis LC vagrant
    - Bobcat, L. rufus LC
  - Genus: Puma
    - Cougar, P. concolor LC extirpated, vagrant
- Family Mephitidae (skunks)
  - Genus: Mephitis
    - Striped skunk, M. mephitis LC
  - Genus: Spilogale
    - Eastern spotted skunk, S. putorius VU possibly extirpated
- Family Mustelidae (weasels, minks, martens, fishers, and otters)
  - Genus: Lontra
    - North American river otter, L. canadensis LC
  - Genus: Martes
    - American marten, M. americana LC
  - Genus: Mustela
    - Stoat, M. erminea LC
    - Least weasel, M. nivalis LC
  - Genus: Neogale
    - Long-tailed weasel, N. frenata LC
    - American mink, N. vison LC
  - Genus: Pekania
    - Fisher, P. pennanti LC
  - Genus: Taxidea
    - American badger, T. taxus LC
- Family Procyonidae (raccoons)
  - Genus: Procyon
    - Common raccoon, P. lotor LC
- Family Ursidae (bears)
  - Genus: Ursus
    - American black bear, U. americanus LC

== Artiodactyla ==
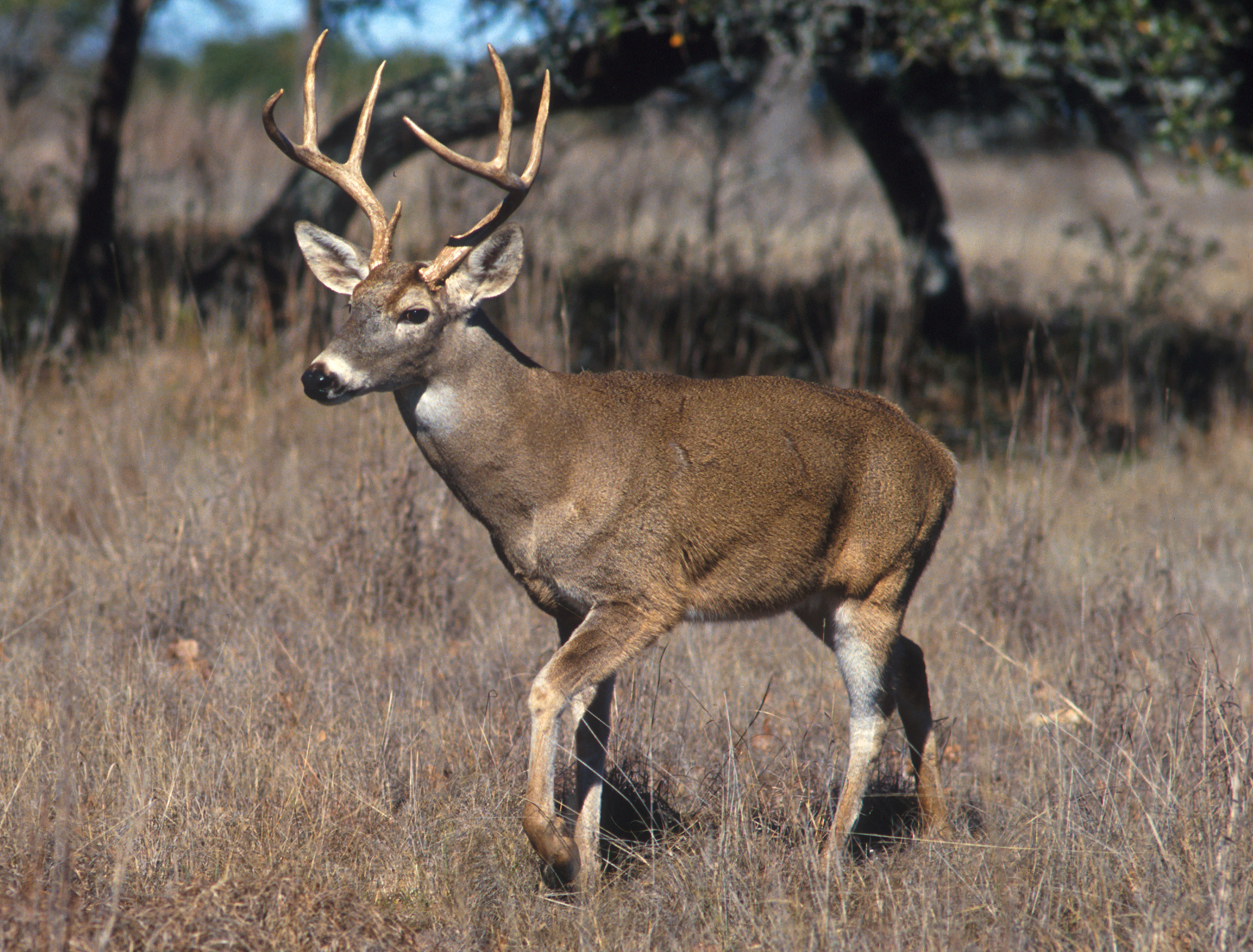
The white-tailed deer is the state wildlife animal of Wisconsin.

- Family Cervidae (deer)
  - Genus: Alces
    - Moose, A. alces LC
  - Genus: Cervus
    - Elk, C. canadensis LC reintroduced
    - White-tailed deer, O. virginianus LC
- Family Bovidae (bovids)
  - Genus: Bison
    - American bison, B. bison NT extirpated

== See also ==
- Lists of mammals by region
- List of U.S. state mammals
- List of amphibians of Wisconsin
- List of birds of Wisconsin
- List of reptiles of Wisconsin
