= List of reptiles of Wisconsin =

The state of Wisconsin is home to thirty-six species of reptiles. These include snakes, lizards, and turtles.

== Snakes ==
Twenty-one species of snake live in Wisconsin.

Common name	Scientific name	IUCN status	Wisconsin status	Picture
Butler's garter snake	Thamnophis butleri	Least concern	Special concern	
Common garter snake	Thamnophis sirtalis	Least concern	Common	
Common watersnake	Nerodia sipedon	Least concern	Common	
DeKay's brown snake	Storeria dekayi	Least concern	Common	
Eastern foxsnake	Pantherophis vulpinus	Least concern	Common	
Eastern hognose snake	Heterodon platirhinos	Least concern	Common	
Eastern massasauga	Sistrurus catenatus	Least concern	Endangered	
Eastern racer	Coluber constrictor	Least concern	Special concern	
Eastern ribbon snake	Thamnophis saurita	Least concern	Endangered	
Gophersnake	Pituophis catenifer	Least concern	Special concern	
Gray ratsnake	Pantherophis spiloides	Least concern	Special concern	
Lined snake	Tropidoclonion lineatum	Least concern	Special concern	
Milk snake	Lampropeltis triangulum	Least concern	Common	
Plains garter snake	Thamnophis radix	Least concern	Special concern	
Queen snake	Regina septemvittata	Least concern	Endangered	
Red-bellied snake	Storeria occipitomaculata	Least concern	Common	
Ring-necked snake	Diadophis punctatus	Least concern	Common (northern); Special concern (prairie)	
Smooth green snake	Opheodrys vernalis	Least concern	Common	
Timber rattlesnake	Crotalus horridus	Least concern	Special concern	
Western ribbon snake	Thamnophis proximus	Least concern	Endangered	
Western worm snake	Carphophis vermis	Least concern	Special concern	

== Lizards ==
Four species of lizard live in Wisconsin.

Common name	Scientific name	IUCN status	Wisconsin status	Picture
Common five-lined skink	Plestiodon fasciatus	Least concern	Common	
Prairie skink	Plestiodon septentrionalis	Least concern	Special concern	
Six-lined racerunner	Aspidoscelis sexlineatus	Least concern	Special concern	
Slender glass lizard	Ophisaurus attenuatus	Least concern	Endangered	

== Turtles ==
Eleven species of turtle live in Wisconsin.

Common name	Scientific name	IUCN status	Wisconsin status	Picture
Blanding's turtle	Emydoidea blandingii	Endangered	Special concern	
Common snapping turtle	Chelydra serpentina	Least concern	Common	
Eastern musk turtle	Sternotherus odoratus	Least concern	Common	
False map turtle	Graptemys pseudogeographica	Least concern	Common	
Northern map turtle	Graptemys geographica	Least concern	Common	
Ornate box turtle	Terrapene ornata	Vulnerable	Endangered	
Ouachita map turtle	Graptemys ouachitensis	Least concern	Common	
Painted turtle	Chrysemys picta	Least concern	Common	
Smooth softshell turtle	Apalone mutica	Least concern	Special concern	
Spiny softshell turtle	Apalone spinifera	Least concern	Common	
Wood turtle	Glyptemys insculpta	Endangered	Threatened	

== See also ==
- List of amphibians of Wisconsin
- List of birds of Wisconsin
- List of mammals of Wisconsin
