= List of amphibians of Wisconsin =

The state of Wisconsin is home to nineteen species of amphibians. These include salamanders, frogs, and toads.

== Salamanders ==
Seven species of salamander live in Wisconsin.

Common name	Scientific name	IUCN status	Wisconsin status	Picture
Blue-spotted salamander	Ambystoma laterale	Least concern	Common	
Eastern newt	Notophthalmus viridescens	Least concern	Common	
Red-backed salamander	Plethodon cinereus	Least concern	Common	
Tiger salamander	Ambystoma tigrinum	Least concern	Common	
Four-toed salamander	Hemidactylium scutatum	Least concern	Special concern	
Common mudpuppy	Necturus maculosus	Least concern	Common	
Spotted salamander	Ambystoma maculatum	Least concern	Common	

== Frogs ==
Eleven species of frog live in Wisconsin.

Common name	Scientific name	IUCN status	Wisconsin status	Picture
American bullfrog	Lithobates catesbeianus	Least concern	Common	
Blanchard's cricket frog	Acris blanchardi	Not assessed	Endangered	
Boreal chorus frog	Pseudacris maculata	Least concern	Common	
Cope's gray treefrog	Dryophytes chrysoscelis	Least concern	Common	
Gray treefrog	Dryophytes versicolor	Least concern	Common	
Green frog	Lithobates clamitans	Least concern	Common	
Mink frog	Lithobates septentrionalis	Least concern	Special concern	
Northern leopard frog	Lithobates pipiens	Least concern	Common	
Pickerel frog	Lithobates palustris	Least concern	Special concern	
Spring peeper	Pseudacris crucifer	Least concern	Common	
Wood frog	Lithobates sylvaticus	Least concern	Common	

== Toads ==
One species of toad lives in Wisconsin.

Common name	Scientific name	IUCN status	Wisconsin status	Picture
American toad	Anaxyrus americanus	Least concern	Common	

== See also ==
- List of birds of Wisconsin
- List of mammals of Wisconsin
- List of reptiles of Wisconsin
