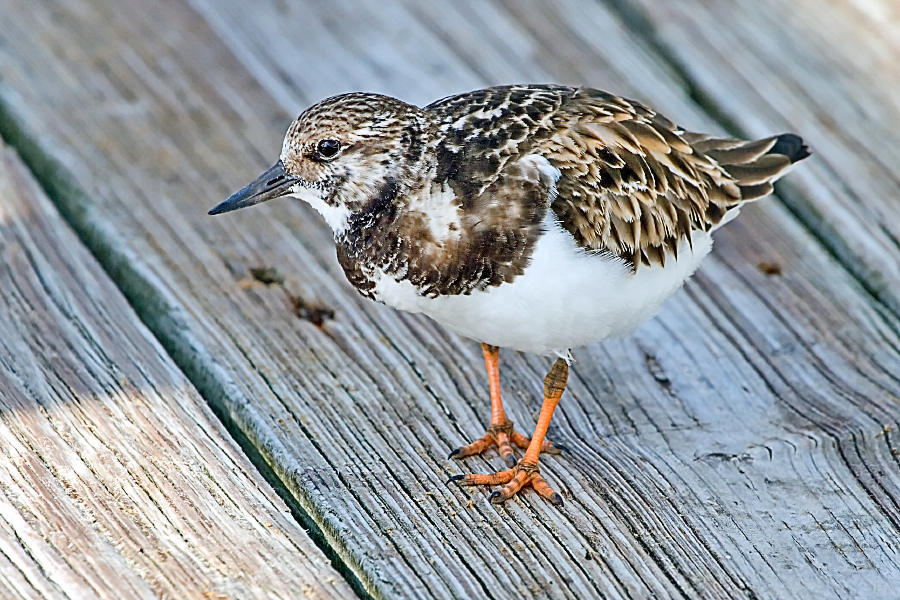
- Ruddy turnstone in nonbreeding plumage
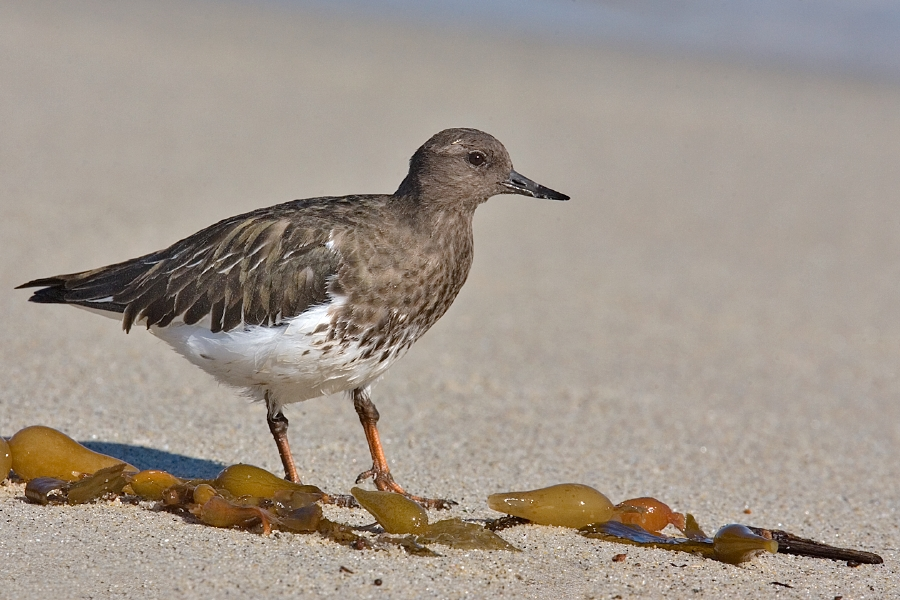
- Black turnstone in winter plumage

Scientific classification
- Kingdom: Animalia
- Phylum: Chordata
- Class: Aves
- Order: Charadriiformes
- Family: Scolopacidae
- Subfamily: Arenariinae
- Genus: Arenaria; Brisson, 1760

Type species
- Tringa interpres Linnaeus, 1758

Species
- Arenaria interpres Arenaria melanocephala

Synonyms
- Arenarius Dumont, 1805; Morinella Meyer in Meyer & Wolf, 1810; Strepsialis Hay, 1841; Strepsilas Illiger, 1811; Strepsilus Nuttall, 1834; Stripsilas Stephens in Shaw, 1819; Stripselas Stephens in Shaw, 1819

= Turnstone =

Genus of birds

Turnstones are two bird species that constitute the genus Arenaria in the family Scolopacidae. They are closely related to calidrid sandpipers and might be considered members of the tribe Calidriini.

The genus Arenaria was introduced by the French zoologist Mathurin Jacques Brisson in 1760 with the ruddy turnstone (Arenaria interpres) as the type species. The genus name arenaria is from Latin arenarius, "inhabiting sand", from arena, "sand".

The genus contains two species: the ruddy turnstone (Arenaria interpres) and the black turnstone (Arenaria melanocephala). Both birds are waders. Their length is typically between 20 and 25 cm, with a wingspan between 50 and 60 cm and a body mass between 110 and 130g. For waders their build is stocky, with short, slightly upturned, wedge shaped bills. They have white patches on the back, wings and tail. They are high Arctic breeders, and are migratory. Their strong necks and powerful, slightly upturned bills are adapted to their feeding technique. As the name implies, these species overturn stones, seaweed, and similar items in search of invertebrate prey. They are strictly coastal, prefer stony beaches to sand, and often share beach space with other species of waders such as purple sandpipers.

== Species ==
Genus Arenaria – Brisson, 1760 – two species
Common name	Scientific name and subspecies	Range	Size and ecology	IUCN status and estimated population
Ruddy turnstone Breeding plumage Non-Breeding plumage	Arenaria interpres (Linnaeus, 1758)	Circumpolar distribution; is also a very long distance migrant, wintering on coasts as far south as South Africa and Australia.	Size: It is one of the species to which the Agreement on the Conservation of African-Eurasian Migratory Waterbirds (AEWA) applies. In breeding plumage, this is a showy bird, with a black-and-white head, chestnut back, white underparts and red legs. The drabber winter plumage is basically brown above and white below. Habitat: On coasts almost everywhere in the world Diet: This is a generally tame bird and is an opportunist feeder. Unlike most waders, it will scavenge, and has a phenomenal list of recorded food items, including human corpses and coconut. The call is a staccato tuck- tuck- tuck.	NT
Black turnstone	Arenaria melanocephala (Vigors, 1829)	Breeding in western Alaska, and wintering mainly on the Pacific coast of the United States.	Size: Black upperparts and chest, and white below. Habitat: Diet:	LC

There exists a fossil bone, a distal piece of tarsometatarsus found in the Edson Beds of Sherman County, Kansas. Dating from the mid-Blancan some 4-3 million years ago, it appears to be from a calidriid somewhat similar to a pectoral sandpiper, but has some traits reminiscent of turnstones. Depending on which traits are apomorphic and plesiomorphic, it may be an ancestral representative of either lineage.
