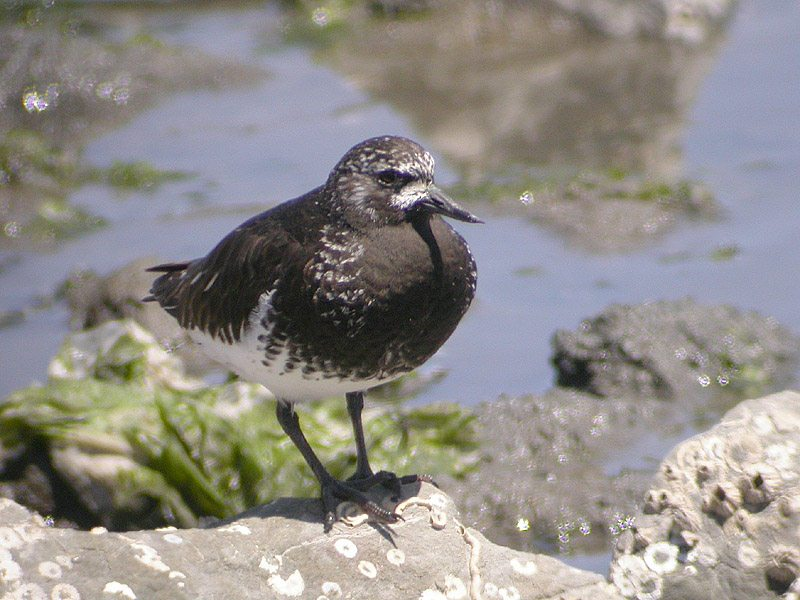
- Breeding-plumaged adult in Alaska

Conservation status
- Least Concern (IUCN 3.1)

Scientific classification
- Kingdom: Animalia
- Phylum: Chordata
- Class: Aves
- Order: Charadriiformes
- Family: Scolopacidae
- Genus: Arenaria
- Species: A. melanocephala

Binomial name
- Arenaria melanocephala (Vigors, 1829)

Synonyms
- Strepsilas melanocephalus Vigors, 1829

= Black turnstone =

Species of bird

The black turnstone (Arenaria melanocephala) is a species of small wading bird. It is one of two species of turnstone in the genus Arenaria, the ruddy turnstone (A. interpres) being the other. It is now classified in the sandpiper family, Scolopacidae, but was formerly sometimes placed in the plover family, Charadriidae. It is native to the west coast of North America and breeds only in Alaska.

== Description ==
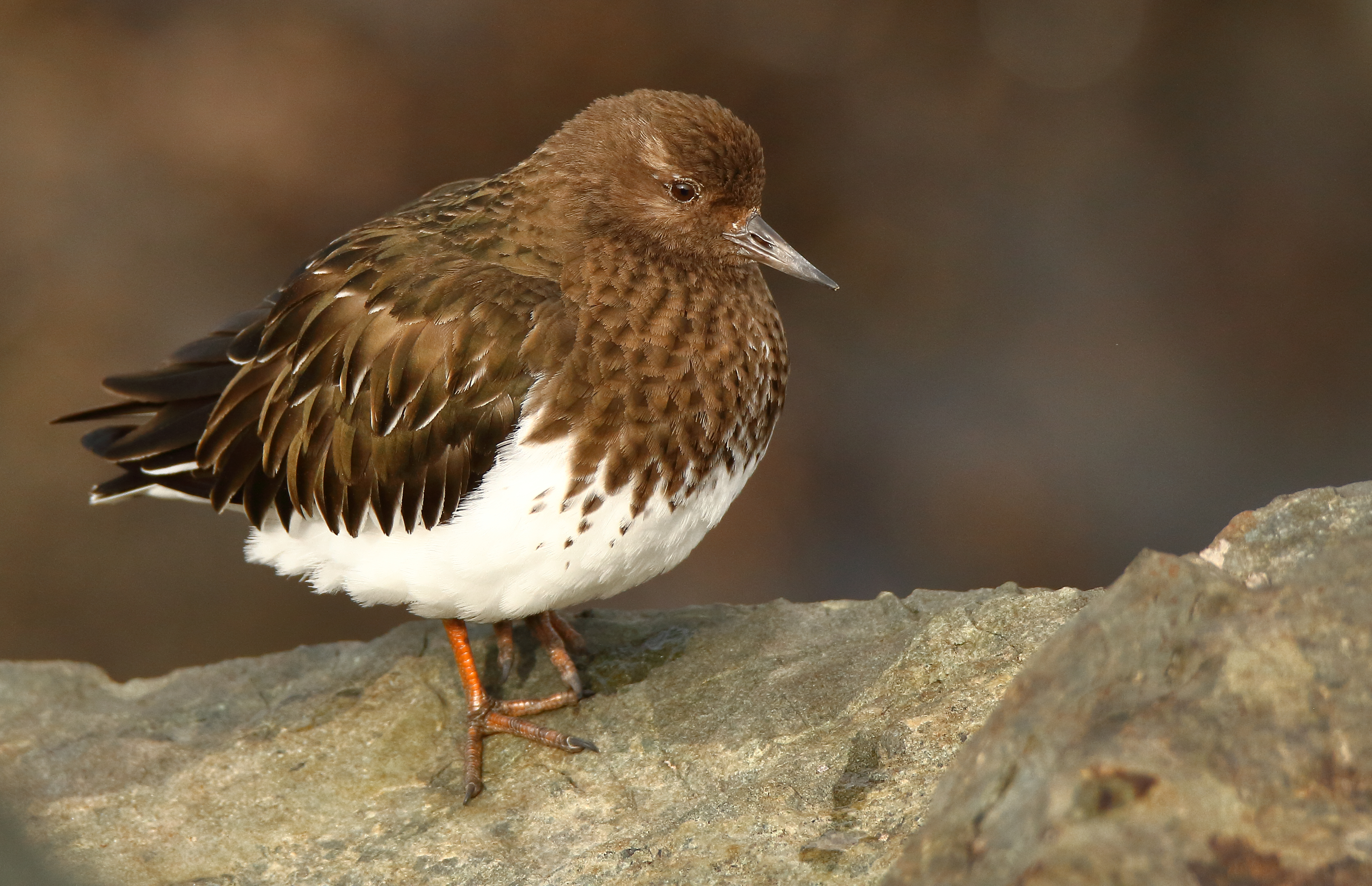
Black turnstone in Humboldt County, California

It is 22–25 centimeters (8.7–9.8 in) long and weighs 100–170 grams (3.5–6.0 oz). The black bill is 20–27 millimeters (0.8–1.1 in) long and slightly upturned. The legs and feet are blackish-brown with a reddish tinge. The bird is largely black and white in appearance. Breeding-plumaged adults have a black head and breast apart from a white spot between the eye and bill, a white stripe over the eye and white flecks on the sides of the breast. The upper parts are blackish-brown with pale fringes to the wing-coverts and scapular feathers. The belly and vent are white. In flight it shows a white wingbar, white shoulder patch and white tail with a broad black band across it. There is white from the lower back to the upper tail-coverts apart from a dark bar across the rump.

In winter, the head and breast become largely dark brown with little white. Juveniles are similar to winter adults but browner with buff fringes to the wing-coverts and scapulars and a grey-brown tip to the tail.

The ruddy turnstone is similar, but has rufous-brown markings on the upper parts and more white on the head and breast, particularly in breeding plumage. It has narrower wings and a narrower white wingbar. Its legs are orange and brighter than those of the black turnstone though there can be some overlap.

The black turnstone has a variety of calls, especially a rattling trill which can be heard throughout the year. This call is higher and less harsh than the similar call of the ruddy turnstone. Other calls include a loud, screeching alarm call and a soft, purring call uttered to young chicks. Displaying males produce a long series of staccato notes in flight as well as chirruping trills on the ground.

== Distribution ==
It breeds in western Alaska from the Alaska Peninsula in the south to Point Hope in the north. The bulk of the population nests in the Yukon–Kuskokwim Delta. It usually nests near the coast but in some areas it occurs further inland along the shores of rivers and lakes. There are a handful of records from north-east Siberia but there has been no sign of breeding there. The world population is estimated at 95,000 birds with about 80,000 of these in the Yukon–Kuskokwim Delta.

It winters on rocky shores along the Pacific coast of North America from southern Alaska southwards as far as north-west Mexico where it occurs in Baja California and Sonora with a single record from Nayarit. It is very occasionally seen inland during spring and fall migration; there are a number of records from the Salton Sea in southern California and scattered sightings from inland US states including Montana, Wisconsin, Nevada and Arizona. Vagrant birds have been recorded from Yukon and the Northwest Territories and there is one record from San Cristóbal Island in the Galápagos Islands.

== Ecology ==
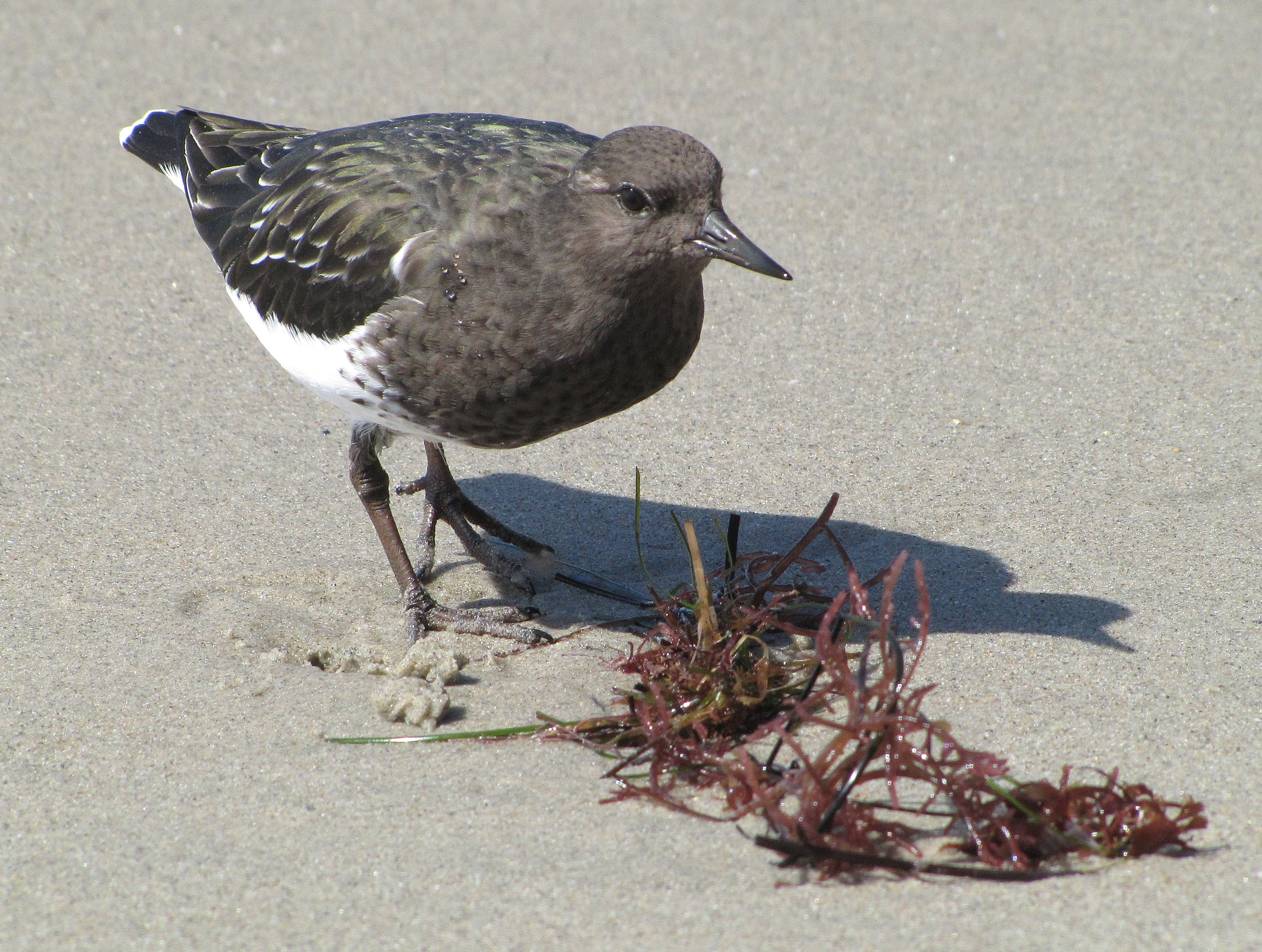
Winter-plumaged bird in California

It feeds mainly on invertebrates, particularly crustaceans and mollusks in winter and insects during the breeding season. Seeds, eggs and carrion are also taken. At the breeding grounds it mainly feeds in wet meadows with sedges. In winter, its typical habitat is rocky coasts but it also feeds on beaches, mudflats and man-made structures such as jetties and breakwaters. It uses its bill to turn over stones, algal mats and other objects to get at prey hidden beneath.

It arrives on its breeding ground from early May to early June with the males arriving first. The birds often return to the same territory and pair with the same mate as previous years. The nest is a scrape dug mainly by the male. It is usually located amongst sedges or grasses or under willows. Four eggs are usually laid; they are olive or pale greenish with darker spots. The eggs are incubated for 21–24 days by both parents. The young birds are precocial and are able to leave the nest and feed themselves soon after hatching. They are able to fly well after 25–34 days.
