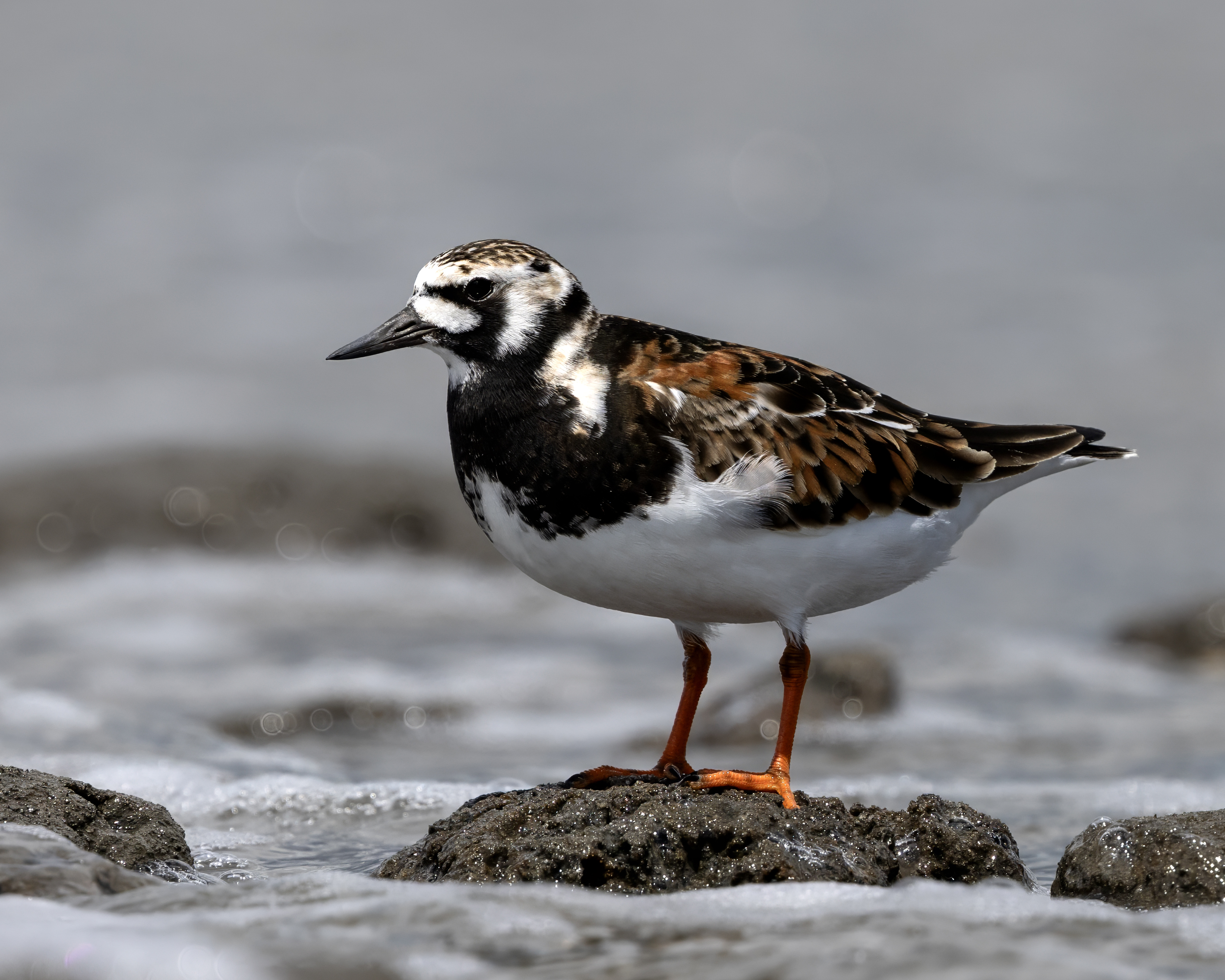
- Adult in breeding plumage
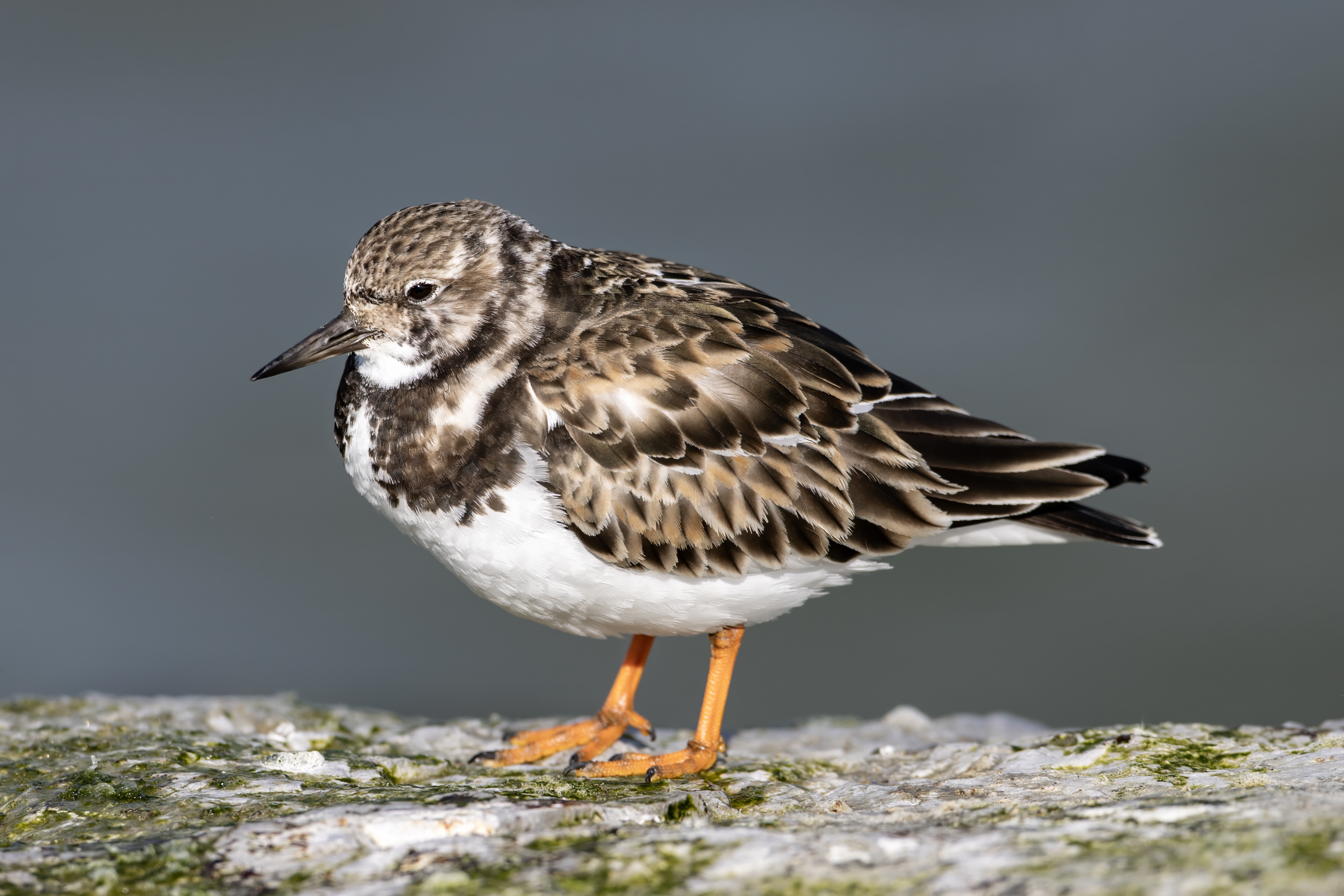
- Adult in non-breeding plumage

Conservation status
- Near Threatened (IUCN 3.1)

Scientific classification
- Kingdom: Animalia
- Phylum: Chordata
- Class: Aves
- Order: Charadriiformes
- Family: Scolopacidae
- Genus: Arenaria
- Species: A. interpres

Binomial name
- Arenaria interpres (Linnaeus, 1758)
- Range Breeding Non-breeding

Synonyms
- Tringa interpres Linnaeus, 1758

= Ruddy turnstone =

Species of bird

The ruddy turnstone (Arenaria interpres) is a small cosmopolitan wading bird, one of two species of turnstone in the genus Arenaria.

It is now classified in the sandpiper family Scolopacidae but was formerly sometimes placed in the plover family Charadriidae. It is a highly migratory bird, breeding in northern parts of Eurasia and North America, and flying south to winter on coastlines almost worldwide. It is the only species of turnstone in much of its range and is often known simply as turnstone.

== Taxonomy ==
The ruddy turnstone was formally described by the Swedish naturalist Carl Linnaeus in 1758 in the tenth edition of his Systema Naturae under the binomial name Tringa interpres. The species is now placed together with the black turnstone in the genus Arenaria that was introduced by the French zoologist Mathurin Jacques Brisson in 1760 with the ruddy turnstone as the type species. The genus name arenaria is from Latin arenarius, "inhabiting sand", from arena, "sand". The specific interpres means "messenger"; when visiting Gotland in 1741, Linnaeus thought that the Swedish word Tolk, meaning "interpreter" applied to this species, but in the local dialect the word means "legs" and is used for the redshank.

Two subspecies are recognised:

- A. i. interpres (Linnaeus, 1758) – breeds in northeast Canada, Greenland, north Europe to northeast Siberia and west Alaska; winters in west, south Europe, Africa, south, east Asia, Australasia, Pacific islands, west US and west Mexico
- A. i. morinella (Linnaeus, 1766) – breeds in northeast Alaska and north Canada; winters in south US to South America

== Description ==
It is a fairly small and stocky bird, 22–24 cm (8.7–9.4 in) long with a wingspan of 50–57 cm (20–22 in) and a weight of 85–150 g (3.0–5.3 oz). The dark, wedge-shaped bill is 2–2.5 cm (0.79–0.98 in) long and slightly upturned. The legs are fairly short at 3.5 cm (1.4 in) and are bright orange.

In all seasons, the plumage is dominated by a harlequin-like pattern of brown, black and white. Breeding birds have reddish-brown upper parts with black markings. The head is mainly white with black streaks on the crown and a black pattern on the face. The breast is mainly black apart from a white patch on the sides. The rest of the underparts are white. In flight it reveals a white wingbar, white patch near the base of the wing and white lower back, rump and tail with dark bands on the uppertail-coverts and near the tip of the tail. The female is slightly duller than the male and has a browner head with more streaking.

Non-breeding adults are duller than breeding birds and have dark grey-brown upperparts with black mottling and a dark head with little white. Juvenile birds have a pale brown head and pale fringes to the upperpart feathers creating a scaly impression.

Birds of the subspecies A. i. morinella are marginally smaller, with darker upperparts and less streaking on the crown.

The ruddy turnstone has a staccato, rattling call and also a chattering alarm-call which is mainly given during the breeding season.

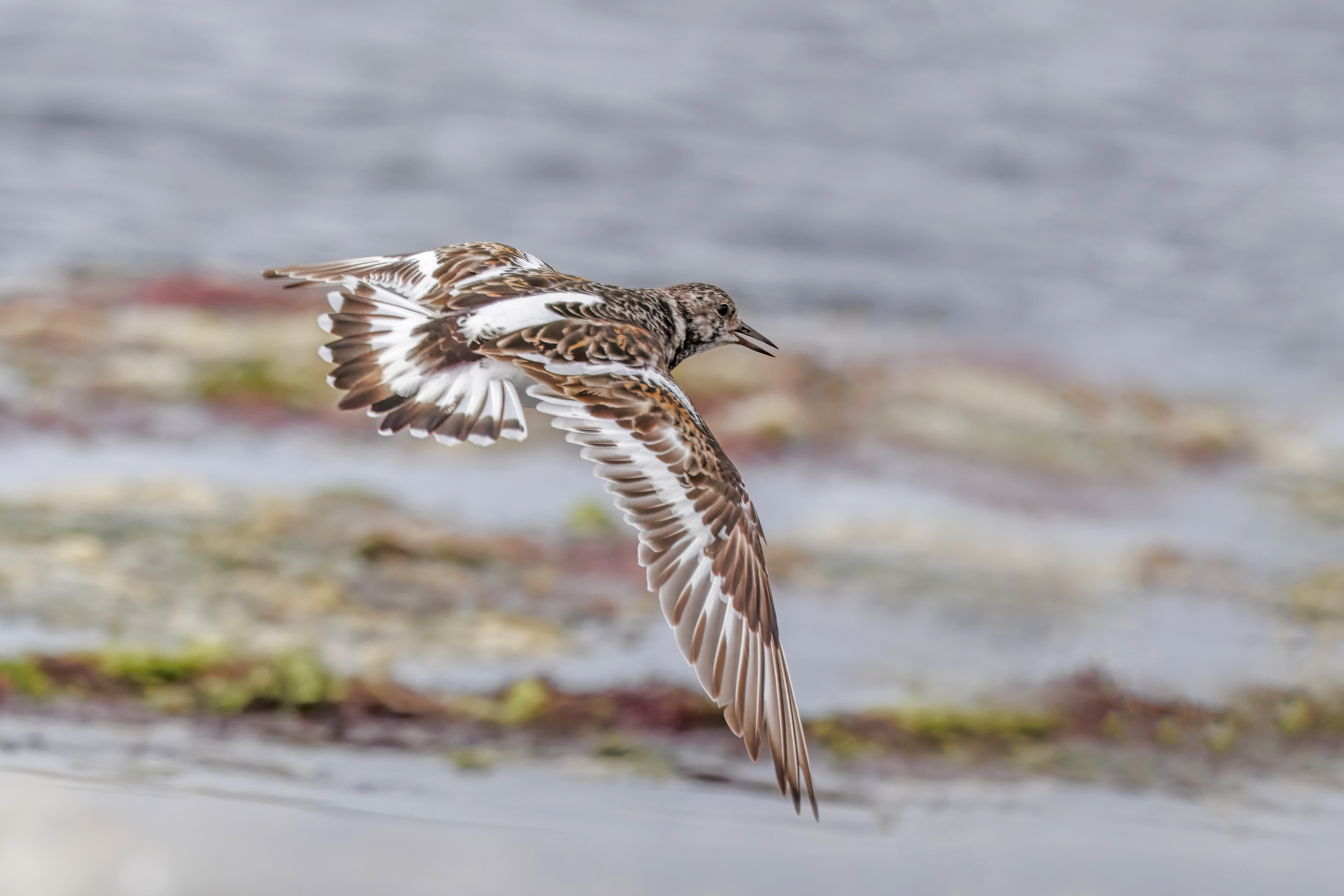
In flight, non-breeding plumage, Chile

== Distribution ==
The ruddy turnstone breeds in northern latitudes, usually no more than a few kilometres from the sea. The subspecies A. i. morinella occurs in northern Alaska and in Arctic Canada as far east as Baffin Island. A. i. interpres breeds in western Alaska, Ellesmere Island, Greenland, Norway, Denmark, Sweden, Finland, Estonia and northern Russia. It formerly bred on the Baltic coast of Germany and has possibly bred in Scotland and the Faroe Islands.

In the Americas, the species winters on coastlines from Washington and Massachusetts southwards to the southern tip of South America although it is scarce in southern parts of Chile and Argentina and is only an unconfirmed vagrant in the Falkland Islands. In Europe, it winters in western regions from Iceland, Norway and Denmark southwards. Only small numbers are found on Mediterranean coasts. In Africa, it is common all the way down to South Africa with good numbers on many offshore islands. In Asia, it is widespread in the south with birds wintering as far north as southern China and Japan (mainly in the Ryukyu Islands). It occurs south to Tasmania and New Zealand and is present on many Pacific islands. Some non-breeding birds remain year round in many parts of the wintering range, with some of those birds still taking on breeding plumage in the spring and summer.

== Behaviour ==
=== Feeding and diet ===
The ruddy turnstone has a varied diet including carrion, eggs, fish and plant material but it feeds mainly on invertebrates. Insects and their larvae are particularly important in the breeding season. At other times it also takes crustaceans, spiders, molluscs, and worms. It often flips over stones and other objects to get at prey items hiding underneath; this behaviour is the origin of the name "turnstone". It usually forages in flocks.

They have also been observed preying on the eggs of other bird species such as gulls, terns, ducks, and even other turnstones, though this behaviour is uncommon. In the majority of observed cases, turnstones typically go after undefended or unattended nests, puncturing the shells with their beaks to get at the contents within.

Ruddy turnstones engage in a variety of behaviours to locate and capture prey. These behaviours can be placed into six general categories:

- Routing: The turnstone manipulates piles of seaweed through flicking, bulldozing, and pecking to expose small crustaceans or gastropod molluscs hidden underneath.
- Turning stones: As suggested by its name, the turnstone flicks stones with its bill to uncover hidden littorinids and gammarid amphipods.
- Digging: With small flicks of its bill, the turnstone creates holes in the ground substrate (usually sand or mud) and then pecks at the exposed prey – often sandhoppers or seaweed flies.
- Probing: The turnstone inserts its bill more than a quarter-length into the ground to get at littorinids and other gastropods.
- Hammer–probing: The turnstone cracks open its prey's shell by using its bill as a hammer, and then extracts the animal inside through pecking and probing.
- Surface pecking: The turnstone uses short, shallow pecks (less than a quarter bill-length) to get at prey at or just below the ground's surface.

There is evidence that turnstones vary between these feeding behaviours based on individual preference, sex, and even social status with respect to other turnstones. In one studied population, dominant individuals tended to engage in routing while preventing subordinates from doing the same. When these dominant individuals were temporarily removed, some of the subordinates started to rout, while others enacted no change in foraging strategy.

=== Aggression and territory defence ===
When foraging, turnstones adopt different postures indicative of their level of dominance. A lowered tail and a hunched stance is associated with chasing and aggression, and thus a dominant individual. Dominance in aggression is age-related, with juveniles assuming the subordinate role a disproportionate amount of the time.

The plumage patterns of ruddy turnstones exhibit an unusual amount of variation in comparison with other shorebirds. Turnstones use these unique plumage patterns to recognize individuals and discriminate intruders in their territory from neighbours occupying an adjacent territory. When a fake fiberglass turnstone model is placed in a turnstone's territory, the occupant is less likely to respond aggressively if the model is painted to have the plumage pattern of a neighbouring turnstone.

=== Ecology ===
Ruddy turnstones can survive in a wide range of habitats and climatic conditions from Arctic to tropical. The typical breeding habitat is open tundra with water nearby. Outside the breeding season, it is found along coasts, particularly on rocky or stony shores. It is often found on man-made structures such as breakwaters and jetties. It may venture onto open grassy areas near the coast. Small numbers sometimes turn up on inland wetlands, especially during the spring and autumn migrations.

In terms of wintering sites, ruddy turnstones are particularly faithful to specific locations. A study published in 2009 examined turnstones wintering along a stretch of coastline in the Firth of Clyde. It found that 95% of birds resident to the area at the end of winter returned the following autumn. The same study also confirmed ruddy turnstones as one of the longest lived wader species, with annual adult mortality rates of under 15%. Their average lifespan is 9 years, with 20 years being the longest recorded.

=== Reproduction ===
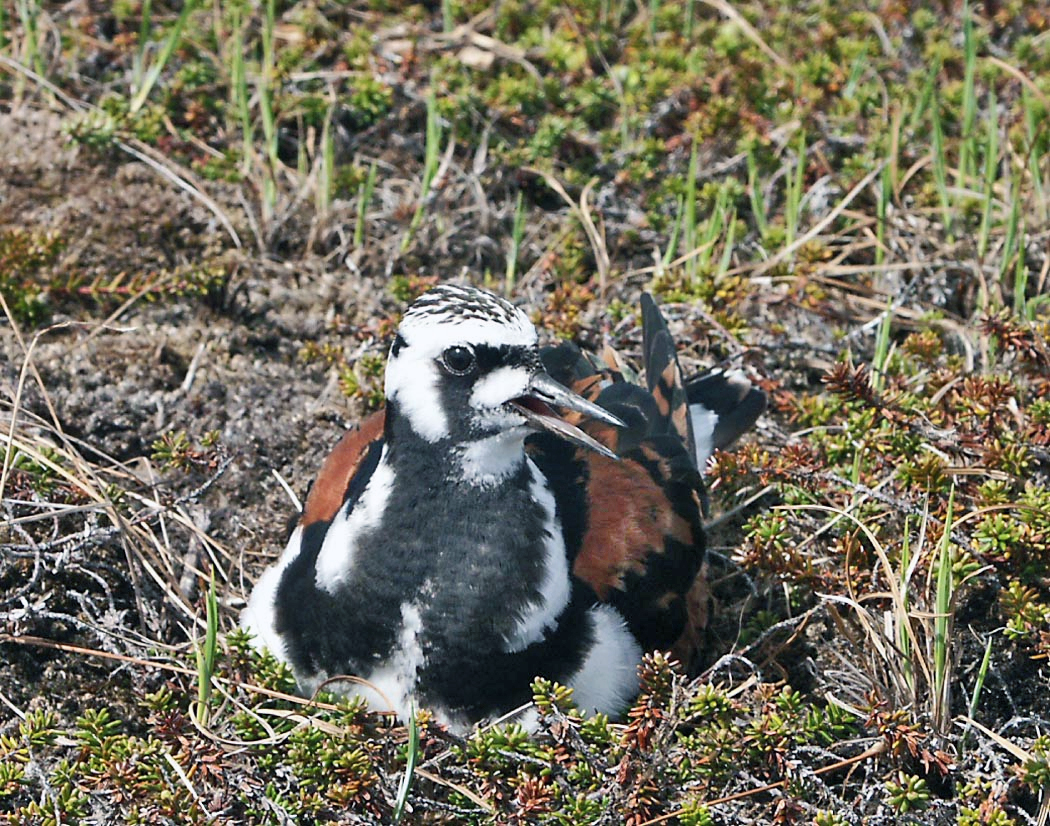
Breeding-plumaged adult on nest

It is a monogamous bird and pairs may remain together for more than one breeding season. The nest is a shallow scrape, often with a lining of leaves. It is about 11 cm (4.3 in) across and 3 cm (1.2 in) deep. It may be built amongst vegetation or on bare stony or rocky ground. Several pairs may nest close together.

A single clutch of two to five eggs is laid with four being most common. The eggs measure about 41 mm × 29 mm (1.6 in × 1.1 in) and weigh around 17.9 g (0.63 oz). They are smooth, slightly glossy and oval to pear-shaped. They are variable in colour but are commonly pale green-brown with dark brown markings, densest at the larger end. Incubation begins when the first egg is laid and lasts for about 22–24 days. The female is mainly responsible for incubating the eggs but the male may help towards the end.

The young birds are precocial and are able to leave the nest soon after hatching. They are buff above with dark grey markings and are white below. They are able to feed themselves but are protected by the parents, particularly the male. They fledge after 19–21 days.

== Status and conservation ==
According to the International Union for Conservation of Nature (IUCN), the ruddy turnstone population is currently very stable. Environment Canada surveys suggest that they have in fact decreased in abundance relative to the 1970s (up to 50% by one estimate) and face a variety of threats during migration and winter. They estimate that the Canadian population is 100,000–500,000 adults. The Canadian Wildlife Service estimates that the worldwide population of ruddy turnstones is 449,000, and that 235,000 are breeding in North America while the rest are breeding throughout the Arctic regions. They are very common and widespread. Their remote breeding range and widespread winter range should help them remain a common species.
