= List of sandpipers =

List of species

A total of 98 species of sandpipers and allies in the family Scolopacidae are accepted by the International Ornithological Committee (IOC). In addition to the species directly called "sandpiper", the family includes curlews, dowitchers, godwits, stints, snipe, woodcocks, and a few other groups. They are distributed among 15 genera, three of which have only one species. Six species are known to be extinct (marked E), and one which is probably extinct, are included.

This list is presented according to the IOC taxonomic sequence and can also be sorted alphabetically by common name and binomial.

Common name	Binomial name	IOC sequence
Upland sandpiper	Bartramia longicauda (Bechstein, 1812)	1
Bristle-thighed curlew	Numenius tahitiensis (Gmelin, JF, 1789)	2
Eurasian whimbrel	Numenius phaeopus (Linnaeus, 1758)	3
Hudsonian whimbrel	Numenius hudsonicus Latham, 1790	4
Little curlew	Numenius minutus Gould, 1841	5
Eskimo curlew	Numenius borealis (Forster, JR, 1772) (probably E)	6
Long-billed curlew	Numenius americanus Bechstein, 1812	7
Far Eastern curlew	Numenius madagascariensis (Linnaeus, 1766)	8
Slender-billed curlew	Numenius tenuirostris Vieillot, 1817 (E)	9
Eurasian curlew	Numenius arquata (Linnaeus, 1758)	10
Bar-tailed godwit	Limosa lapponica (Linnaeus, 1758)	11
Black-tailed godwit	Limosa limosa (Linnaeus, 1758)	12
Hudsonian godwit	Limosa haemastica (Linnaeus, 1758)	13
Marbled godwit	Limosa fedoa (Linnaeus, 1758)	14
Asian dowitcher	Limnodromus semipalmatus (Blyth, 1848)	15
Long-billed dowitcher	Limnodromus scolopaceus (Say, 1822)	16
Short-billed dowitcher	Limnodromus griseus (Gmelin, JF, 1789)	17
Jack snipe	Lymnocryptes minimus (Brünnich, 1764)	18
American woodcock	Scolopax minor Gmelin, JF, 1789	19
Eurasian woodcock	Scolopax rusticola Linnaeus, 1758	20
Amami woodcock	Scolopax mira Hartert, EJO, 1916	21
Bukidnon woodcock	Scolopax bukidnonensis Kennedy, RS, Fisher, TH, Harrap, Diesmos & Manamtam, 2001	22
Javan woodcock	Scolopax saturata Horsfield, 1821	23
New Guinea woodcock	Scolopax rosenbergii Schlegel, 1871	24
Sulawesi woodcock	Scolopax celebensis Riley, 1921	25
Moluccan woodcock	Scolopax rochussenii Schlegel, 1866	26
North Island snipe	Coenocorypha barrierensis Oliver, 1955 (E)	27
South Island snipe	Coenocorypha iredalei Rothschild, 1921 (E)	28
Chatham Islands snipe	Coenocorypha pusilla (Buller, 1869)	29
Snares snipe	Coenocorypha huegeli (Tristram, 1893)	30
Subantarctic snipe	Coenocorypha aucklandica (Gray, GR, 1845)	31
Imperial snipe	Gallinago imperialis Sclater, PL & Salvin, 1869	32
Jameson's snipe	Gallinago jamesoni (Jardine & Bonaparte, 1855)	33
Fuegian snipe	Gallinago stricklandii (Gray, GR, 1845)	34
Solitary snipe	Gallinago solitaria Hodgson, 1831	35
Wood snipe	Gallinago nemoricola Hodgson, 1836	36
Great snipe	Gallinago media (Latham, 1787)	37
Swinhoe's snipe	Gallinago megala Swinhoe, 1861	38
Pin-tailed snipe	Gallinago stenura (Bonaparte, 1831)	39
Latham's snipe	Gallinago hardwickii (Gray, JE, 1831)	40
African snipe	Gallinago nigripennis Bonaparte, 1839	41
Common snipe	Gallinago gallinago (Linnaeus, 1758)	42
Wilson's snipe	Gallinago delicata (Ord, 1825)	43
Giant snipe	Gallinago undulata (Boddaert, 1783)	44
Noble snipe	Gallinago nobilis Sclater, PL, 1856	45
Puna snipe	Gallinago andina Taczanowski, 1875	46
Madagascar snipe	Gallinago macrodactyla Bonaparte, 1839	47
Pantanal snipe	Gallinago paraguaiae (Vieillot, 1816)	48
Magellanic snipe	Gallinago magellanica (King, PP, 1828)	49
Wilson's phalarope	Phalaropus tricolor (Vieillot, 1819)	50
Red phalarope	Phalaropus fulicarius (Linnaeus, 1758)	51
Red-necked phalarope	Phalaropus lobatus (Linnaeus, 1758)	52
Terek sandpiper	Xenus cinereus (Güldenstädt, 1775)	53
Common sandpiper	Actitis hypoleucos (Linnaeus, 1758)	54
Spotted sandpiper	Actitis macularius (Linnaeus, 1766)	55
Green sandpiper	Tringa ochropus Linnaeus, 1758	56
Solitary sandpiper	Tringa solitaria Wilson, A, 1813	57
Grey-tailed tattler	Tringa brevipes (Vieillot, 1816)	58
Wandering tattler	Tringa incana (Gmelin, JF, 1789)	59
Marsh sandpiper	Tringa stagnatilis (Bechstein, 1803)	60
Wood sandpiper	Tringa glareola Linnaeus, 1758	61
Common redshank	Tringa totanus (Linnaeus, 1758)	62
Lesser yellowlegs	Tringa flavipes (Gmelin, JF, 1789)	63
Nordmann's greenshank	Tringa guttifer (Nordmann, 1835)	64
Willet	Tringa semipalmata (Gmelin, JF, 1789)	65
Spotted redshank	Tringa erythropus (Pallas, 1764)	66
Common greenshank	Tringa nebularia (Gunnerus, 1767)	67
Greater yellowlegs	Tringa melanoleuca (Gmelin, JF, 1789)	68
Kiritimati sandpiper	Prosobonia cancellata (Gmelin, JF, 1789) (E)	69
Tahiti sandpiper	Prosobonia leucoptera (Gmelin, JF, 1789) (E)	70
Moorea sandpiper	Prosobonia ellisi Sharpe, 1906 (E)	71
Tuamotu sandpiper	Prosobonia parvirostris (Peale, 1849)	72
Ruddy turnstone	Arenaria interpres (Linnaeus, 1758)	73
Black turnstone	Arenaria melanocephala (Vigors, 1829)	74
Great knot	Calidris tenuirostris (Horsfield, 1821)	75
Red knot	Calidris canutus (Linnaeus, 1758)	76
Surfbird	Calidris virgata (Gmelin, JF, 1789)	77
Ruff	Calidris pugnax (Linnaeus, 1758)	78
Broad-billed sandpiper	Calidris falcinellus (Pontoppidan, 1763)	79
Sharp-tailed sandpiper	Calidris acuminata (Horsfield, 1821)	80
Stilt sandpiper	Calidris himantopus (Bonaparte, 1826)	81
Curlew sandpiper	Calidris ferruginea (Pontoppidan, 1763)	82
Temminck's stint	Calidris temminckii (Leisler, 1812)	83
Long-toed stint	Calidris subminuta (Middendorff, 1853)	84
Red-necked stint	Calidris ruficollis (Pallas, 1776)	85
Spoon-billed sandpiper	Calidris pygmaea (Linnaeus, 1758)	86
Buff-breasted sandpiper	Calidris subruficollis (Vieillot, 1819)	87
Sanderling	Calidris alba (Pallas, 1764)	88
Dunlin	Calidris alpina (Linnaeus, 1758)	89
Purple sandpiper	Calidris maritima (Brünnich, 1764)	90
Rock sandpiper	Calidris ptilocnemis (Coues, 1873)	91
Baird's sandpiper	Calidris bairdii (Coues, 1861)	92
Little stint	Calidris minuta (Leisler, 1812)	93
Least sandpiper	Calidris minutilla (Vieillot, 1819)	94
White-rumped sandpiper	Calidris fuscicollis (Vieillot, 1819)	95
Pectoral sandpiper	Calidris melanotos (Vieillot, 1819)	96
Western sandpiper	Calidris mauri (Cabanis, 1857)	97
Semipalmated sandpiper	Calidris pusilla (Linnaeus, 1766)	98
