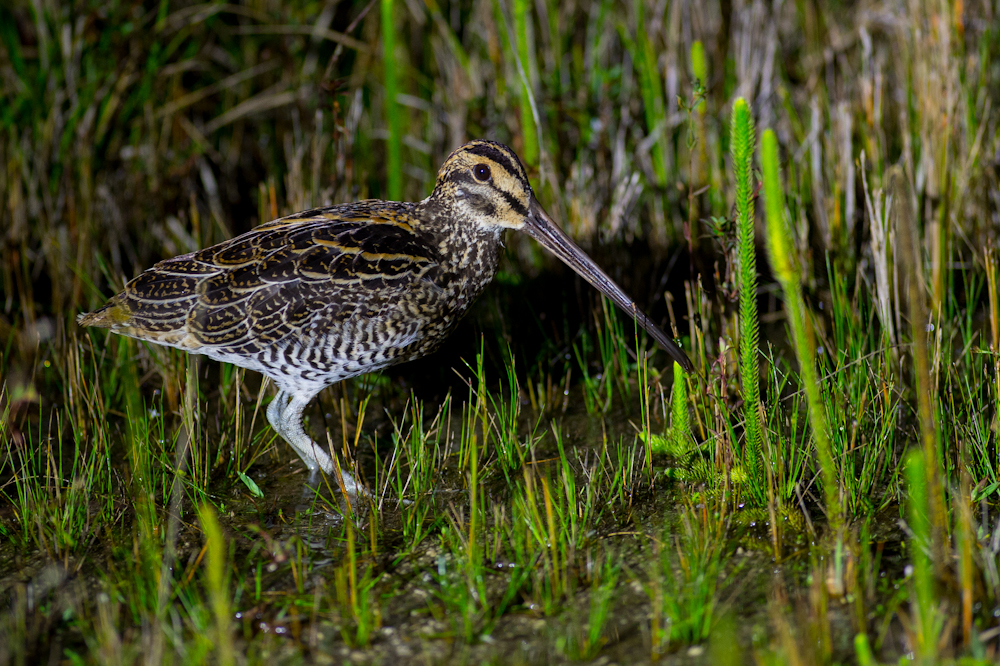

Conservation status
- Least Concern (IUCN 3.1)

Scientific classification
- Kingdom: Animalia
- Phylum: Chordata
- Class: Aves
- Order: Charadriiformes
- Family: Scolopacidae
- Genus: Gallinago
- Species: G. undulata

Binomial name
- Gallinago undulata (Boddaert, 1783)

= Giant snipe =

Species of bird

The giant snipe (Gallinago undulata) is a stocky wader. It breeds in South America. The nominate subspecies G. u. undulata occurs in two distinct areas, one in Colombia, and the other from Venezuela through Guyana, Suriname and French Guiana to extreme north-eastern Brazil. The southern subspecies G. u. gigantea is found in eastern Bolivia, eastern Paraguay and south-east Brazil, and probably also in Uruguay and north-eastern Argentina.

It occurs in tall vegetation in swamps and flooded grasslands, and occasionally in dry savannah. It ranges from the lowlands up to 2,200 m altitude.

It seems to arrive in some areas after rain, but its seasonal movements are very poorly understood.

== Taxonomy ==
The giant snipe was described by the French polymath Georges-Louis Leclerc, Comte de Buffon in 1780 in his Histoire Naturelle des Oiseaux from a specimen collected in Cayenne, French Guiana. The bird was also illustrated in a hand-coloured plate engraved by François-Nicolas Martinet in the Planches Enluminées D'Histoire Naturelle which was produced under the supervision of Edme-Louis Daubenton to accompany Buffon's text. Neither the plate caption nor Buffon's description included a scientific name but in 1783 the Dutch naturalist Pieter Boddaert coined the binomial name Scolopax undulata in his catalogue of the Planches Enluminées. The giant snipe is now placed in the genus Gallinago that was introduced by the French zoologist Mathurin Jacques Brisson in 1760. The generic name is Neo-Latin for a woodcock or snipe from Latin gallina, "hen" and the suffix -ago, "resembling". The specific epithet undulatus is Latin for "with wave-like markings".

Two subspecies are recognised:

- G. u. undulata (Boddaert, 1783) – Colombia, Venezuela, the Guianas, north Brazil
- G. u. gigantea (Temminck, 1826) – east Bolivia to Paraguay, southeast Brazil and northeast Argentina

== Description ==
This is the largest snipe at 36 to 47 cm (14 to 19 in) in length. G. u. gigantea, as its name suggests, is larger than the nominate subspecies with little overlap in size; for example, its bill length is usually more than 12 cm (4.7 in), whereas G. u. undulata is usually less than 11.5 cm (4.5 in) and total length is up to about 43.5 cm (17.1 in). Body mass in the nominate subspecies is from 270 to 362 g (9.5 to 12.8 oz), averaging 294 g (10.4 oz) in males and 332 g (11.7 oz), while in G. u. gigantea, body mass is known to range from 420 to 500 g (15 to 18 oz).

The giant snipe has a stocky body and relatively short legs for a wader. It has broad rounded wings like a woodcock and a very long bill. Its upperparts, head and neck are streaked and patterned with black and brown, and chestnut edges to the feathers form distinct lines down its back. The belly is white with brown barring on the flanks. The flight feathers are barred, a feature unique to this snipe. The horn-coloured bill is very long and straight. The legs and feet are greyish-green.

No plumage differences related to age or sex are known, but in other snipe the sexes are similar and immature birds differ only in showing pale fringes on the wing coverts.

The giant snipe has a kek-kek call when flushed, and a rasping trisyllabic call is given in its nocturnal display flight.

Giant snipe can be distinguished from the sympatric common and the Magellan snipe by its huge size and rounded wings. The other large species, Andean, Fuegian and imperial snipe, are upland species which lack the well-defined upperpart markings and white belly shown by giant snipe. The noble snipe is more similar to giant, but obviously smaller-bodied.

== Behaviour ==
Nests of the southern race have been found in Brazil in September and from November to early January. They are placed on a hillock between swamps, and 2–4 eggs are laid. No nests of the nominate subspecies have been found.

This species is rarely seen on the ground, and its habitat, reluctance to flush until almost trodden on, cryptic plumage, and nocturnal feeding mean its habits are almost unknown. Its diet apparently includes frogs. The giant snipe is usually seen alone when flushed.

Other Gallinago snipes have an aerial display, which involves flying high in circles, followed by a powerful stoop during which the bird makes a drumming sound, caused by vibrations of modified outer tail feathers. This species displays at night, but it is not known whether it drums.

== Status ==
The giant snipe is hunted through most of its range, its large size making it easier to shoot than other snipes. Habitat loss is also a threat, at least in part of its range. It is nowhere common, and is local and uncommon in Colombia and Venezuela, but its nocturnal habits and extremely secretive behaviour might exaggerate its apparent scarcity, and it is currently not thought to be threatened.
