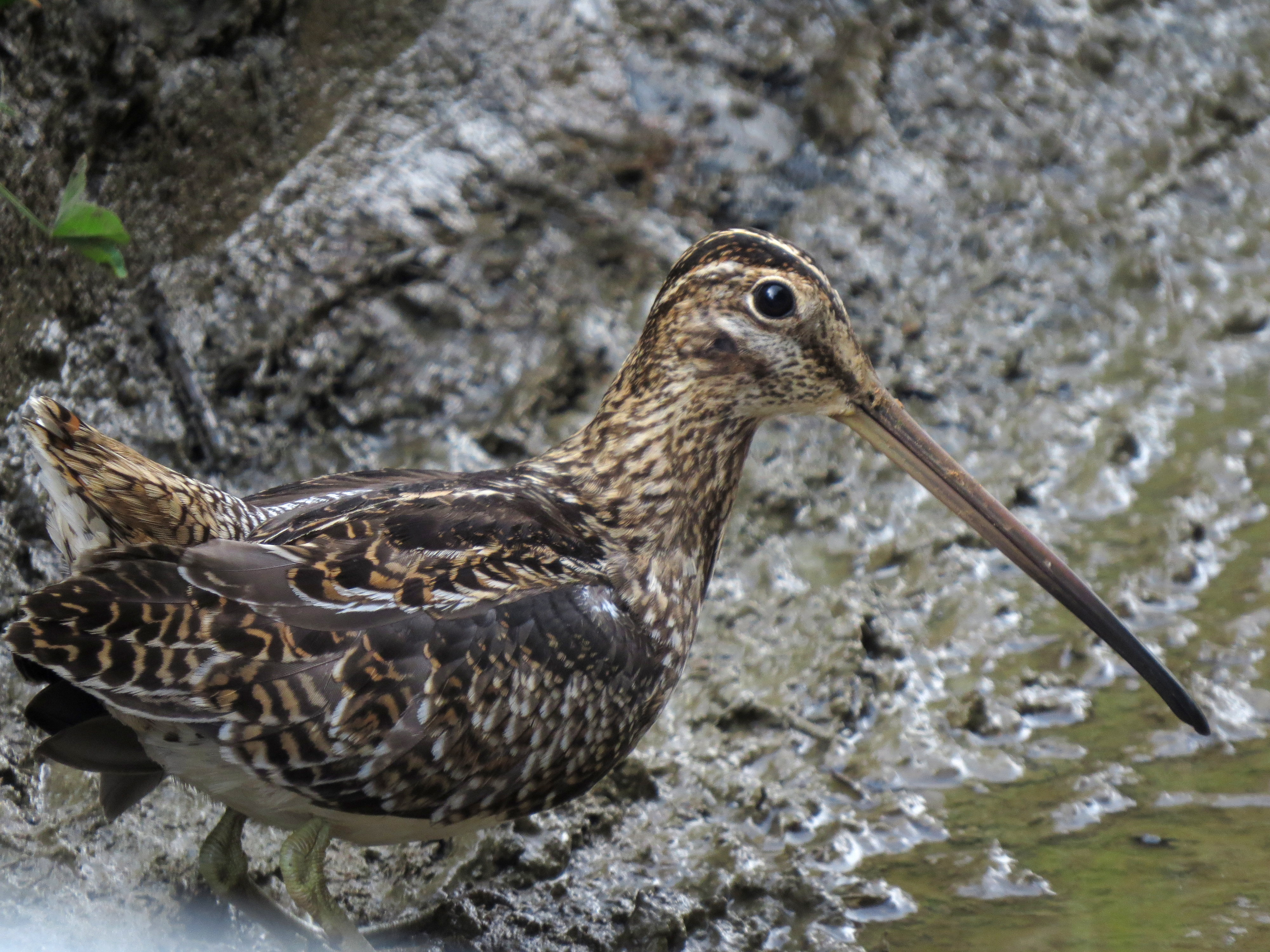

Conservation status
- Near Threatened (IUCN 3.1)

Scientific classification
- Kingdom: Animalia
- Phylum: Chordata
- Class: Aves
- Order: Charadriiformes
- Family: Scolopacidae
- Genus: Gallinago
- Species: G. nobilis

Binomial name
- Gallinago nobilis Sclater, PL, 1856

= Noble snipe =

Species of bird

The noble snipe (Gallinago nobilis) is a small stocky wader. It breeds in the Andes of Colombia, Ecuador, Peru and Venezuela above or just below the treeline. It is entirely sedentary.

== Description ==
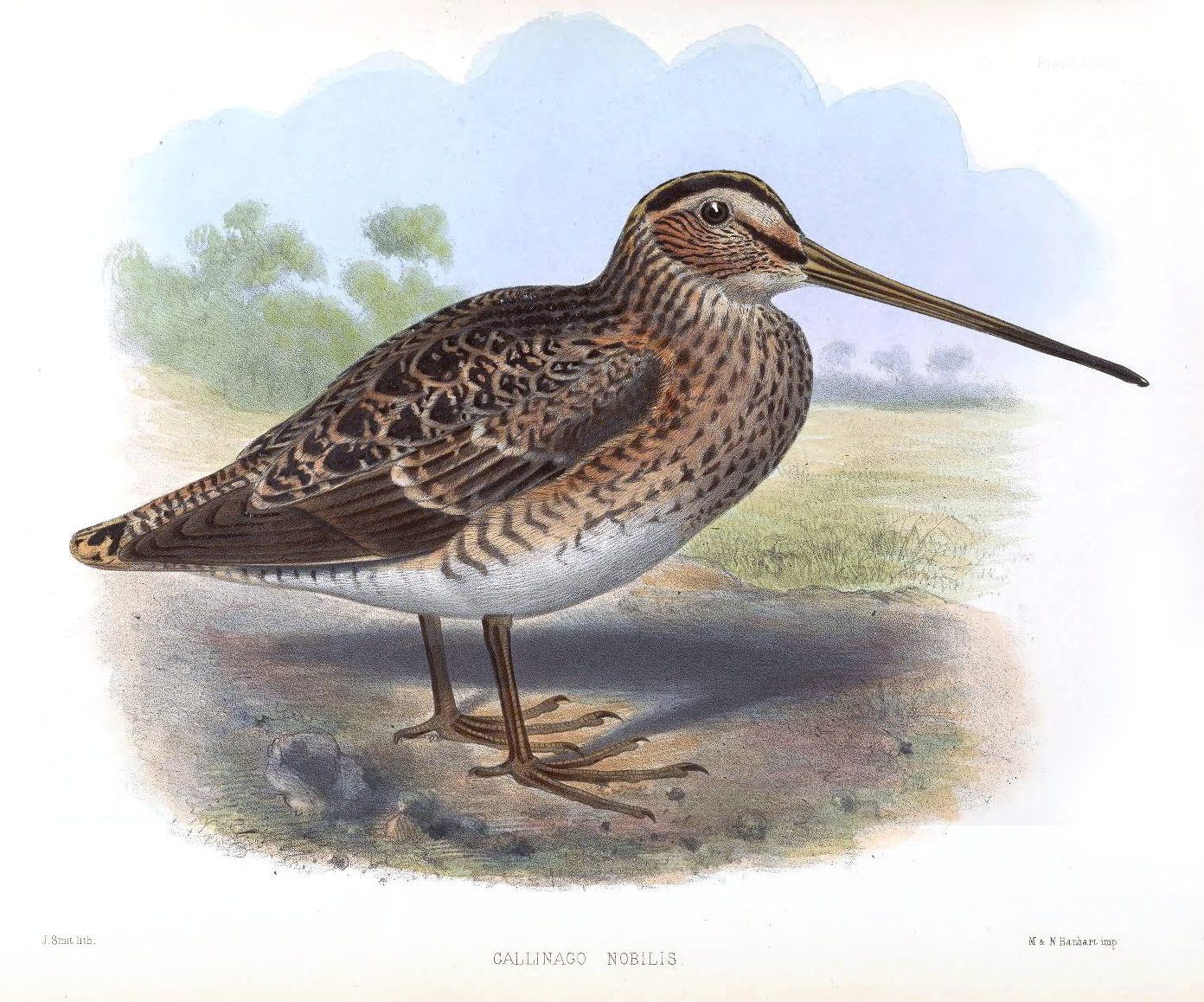
Illustration by Joseph Smit

This 30–32.5 cm long snipe has a stocky body and relatively short legs for a wader. Its upperparts, head and neck are streaked and patterned with dark brown and buff, and gold edges to the feathers form distinct lines down its back. The belly is white with brown barring on the flanks. The horn-coloured bill is very long and straight. The legs and feet are greyish-green. The sexes are similar, but females are longer billed; immature birds differ only in showing pale fringes on the wing coverts. The noble snipe has a clear melodious call.

Jameson's snipe occurs within the range of noble snipe, but has broad wings, a barred belly and dark underparts. Migrant Wilson's and Magellan snipe are smaller, have more pointed wings and white trailing edged to the wings.

== Behaviour ==
The noble snipe is found high altitude wet grassland marshes and swamps from 2,700 – 4,200 m.

Little is known of its biology, but it has an aerial display, which involves flying high in circles, followed by a powerful stoop during which the bird makes a drumming sound, caused by vibrations of modified outer tail feathers, lower pitched than that of Wilson's snipe. It breeds from March to July.

The noble snipe is usually alone or in pairs, but is difficult to observe on the ground. It forages by pushing its long bill deep into the mud seeking insects and worms. Its cryptic plumage provides effective camouflage when the bird stands motionless amongst marsh vegetation.
