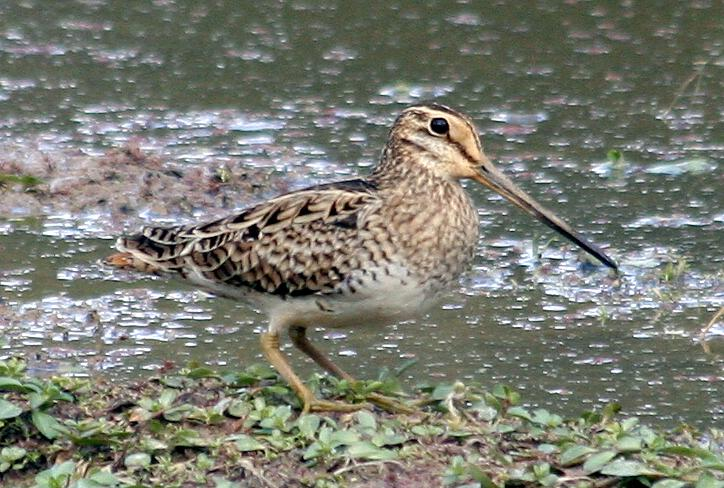

Conservation status
- Near Threatened (IUCN 3.1)

Scientific classification
- Kingdom: Animalia
- Phylum: Chordata
- Class: Aves
- Order: Charadriiformes
- Family: Scolopacidae
- Genus: Gallinago
- Species: G. hardwickii

Binomial name
- Gallinago hardwickii (Gray, JE, 1831)

= Latham's snipe =

Species of bird

Latham's snipe (Gallinago hardwickii), also Japanese snipe is a medium-sized, long-billed, migratory snipe of the East Asian–Australasian Flyway. The origin of the bird's common name is not clear. John Latham was a well-known English physician and ornithologist in the late 18th and early 19th centuries, and had a great interest in Australasian birds. However, he had no apparent connection with the snipe named after him.

== Description ==
The snipe is 29–33 cm long, with a wingspan of 50–54 cm and weight of 150–230 g.

=== Identification ===
It is identifiable as a Gallinago snipe by its cryptically-patterned black, brown, buff and white plumage. However, in the field it is not easily distinguished from Swinhoe's snipe and the pin-tailed snipe, though it is slightly larger.

== Distribution and habitat ==
The snipe breeds mainly in Hokkaidō in northern Japan, with smaller numbers on Honshū, the eastern Russian mainland and Sakhalin and, historically, the Kurile Islands. The entire population migrates and spends the non-breeding season principally in eastern Australia, where it is the commonest Gallinago snipe. It has been recorded on migration in Taiwan, the Philippines and New Guinea, and is a rare straggler to New Zealand.

The snipe's breeding habitat in Asia includes alpine moorland, grasslands, rough pasture, young tree plantations and cultivated areas. Its non-breeding habitat in Australia is shallow freshwater wetlands of various kinds, with bare mud or shallow water for feeding, and nearby vegetation cover for shelter.

== Behaviour ==
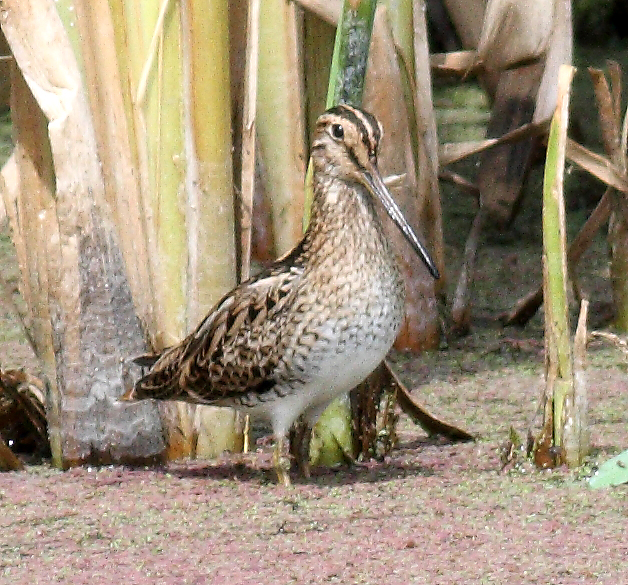
Latham's snipe at Jerrabomberra Wetlands, Canberra, ACT, Australia

=== Breeding ===
Courtship consists of display flights and drumming by the males. They nest on the ground, concealed in vegetation, with a clutch of four eggs.

=== Feeding ===
Latham's snipe is an omnivorous species that feeds on seeds and other plant material (mainly from species in families such as Cyperaceae, Poaceae, Juncaceae, Polygonaceae, Ranunculaceae and Fabaceae), and on invertebrates including insects (mainly flies and beetles), earthworms, spiders and occasionally molluscs, isopods and centipedes.

== Status and conservation ==
Internationally, Latham's snipe is considered to be a near-threatened species. In Australia, it was formerly hunted as a gamebird but is now fully protected and, following assessment in the 2020, is listed as "vulnerable" under the Australian EPBC Act. It is listed as "rare" under South Australia's National Parks and Wildlife Act 1972

In Japan, the Ministry of the Environment's 'Red List' classes the species as Near threatened (NT). Human development has increased the number of suitable breeding sites in Hokkaido, however the population is declining nonetheless.
