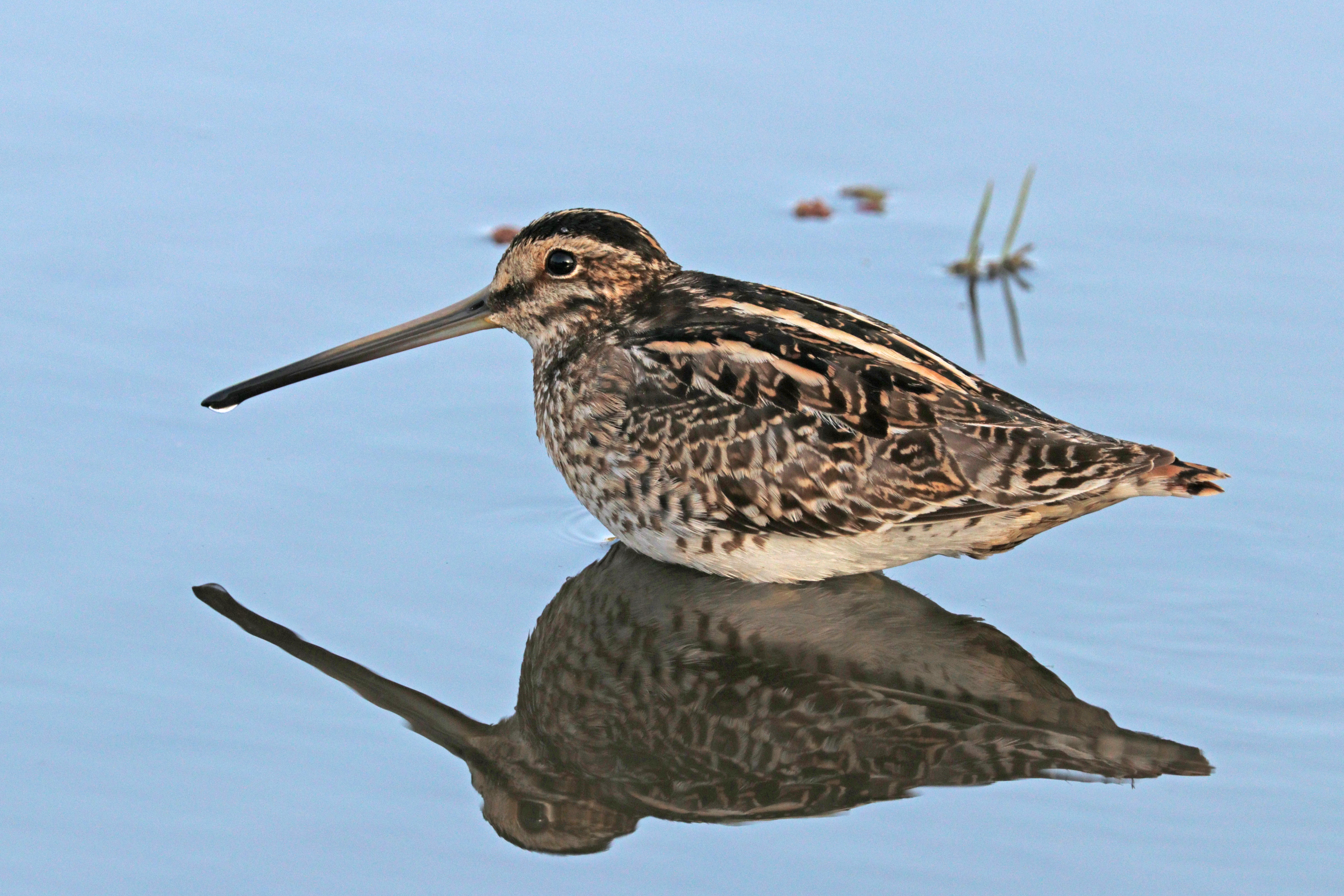
- G. n. aequatorialis Lake Ziway, Ethiopia

Conservation status
- Least Concern (IUCN 3.1)

Scientific classification
- Kingdom: Animalia
- Phylum: Chordata
- Class: Aves
- Order: Charadriiformes
- Family: Scolopacidae
- Genus: Gallinago
- Species: G. nigripennis

Binomial name
- Gallinago nigripennis Bonaparte, 1839

= African snipe =

Species of bird

The African snipe (Gallinago nigripennis) also known as the Ethiopian snipe, is a small stocky wader. It breeds in eastern and southern Africa in wet mountain moorland and swamps at altitudes of 1,700–4,000 m (5,600–13,100 ft). When not breeding it disperses widely, including into coastal lowlands.

== Description ==
This 30–32 cm (12–13 in) long snipe has a stocky body and relatively short legs for a wader. Its upperparts, head and neck are streaked and patterned with bold dark brown stripes and gold edges to the feathers forming lines down its back. The belly is white, with some brown barring on the flanks but never on the belly. The pinkish-brown bill is very long, straight and fairly robust. The legs and feet are yellowish-olive to greenish-grey. The sexes are similar, and immatures differ only in showing pale fringes on the wing coverts.

The African snipe makes a hleep call as it takes off, and has a far carrying kip call when breeding. It shows white trailing edges on the wings and white tail corners in flight.

The African snipe can only be confused with the three migrant snipes that occur in its range, common, pin-tailed and great snipe. Great snipe is obviously larger, darker, and relatively shorter billed. Pintail snipe lacks the white trailing edges on the wings and its tail corners have very little white.

The common snipe is very similar to African although African is darker above and longer-billed; identification on the ground is very difficult. In flight, African has a slower, more fluttering flight on its more rounded wings, and zig-zags less when flushed. The more extensive white in the tail is often obvious.

== Subspecies ==
There are three subspecies of the African snipe:

- G. n. aequatorialis, (Rüppell, 1845), Ethiopia to eastern D. R. Congo, eastern Zimbabwe and northern Mozambique.
- G. n. angolensis, (Barbosa du Bocage, 1868), Angola and northern Namibia to Zambia and western Zimbabwe.
- G. n. nigripennis, (Bonaparte, 1839), southern Mozambique and South Africa.

== Behaviour ==
The African snipe builds a saucer-shaped nest of dry grass in the drier areas of its breeding marshes. The nest is concealed in a dense tuft of grass or rushes. Breeding is dependent on the rains in the tropics, but mainly April to October in South Africa, although nesting has occurred in all months.

This bird has a spectacular aerial display, which involves flying high in circles, followed by a powerful stoop during which the bird makes a drumming sound, caused by vibrations of modified outer tail feathers.

The African snipe is quite common in suitable marshy areas of wetlands and dams. It forages by pushing its long bill deep into the mud seeking insects and worms. If alarmed, it freezes, and its cryptic plumage provides effective camouflage when the bird stands motionless amongst marsh vegetation. When flushed, it flies off fast with a zigzagging action.
