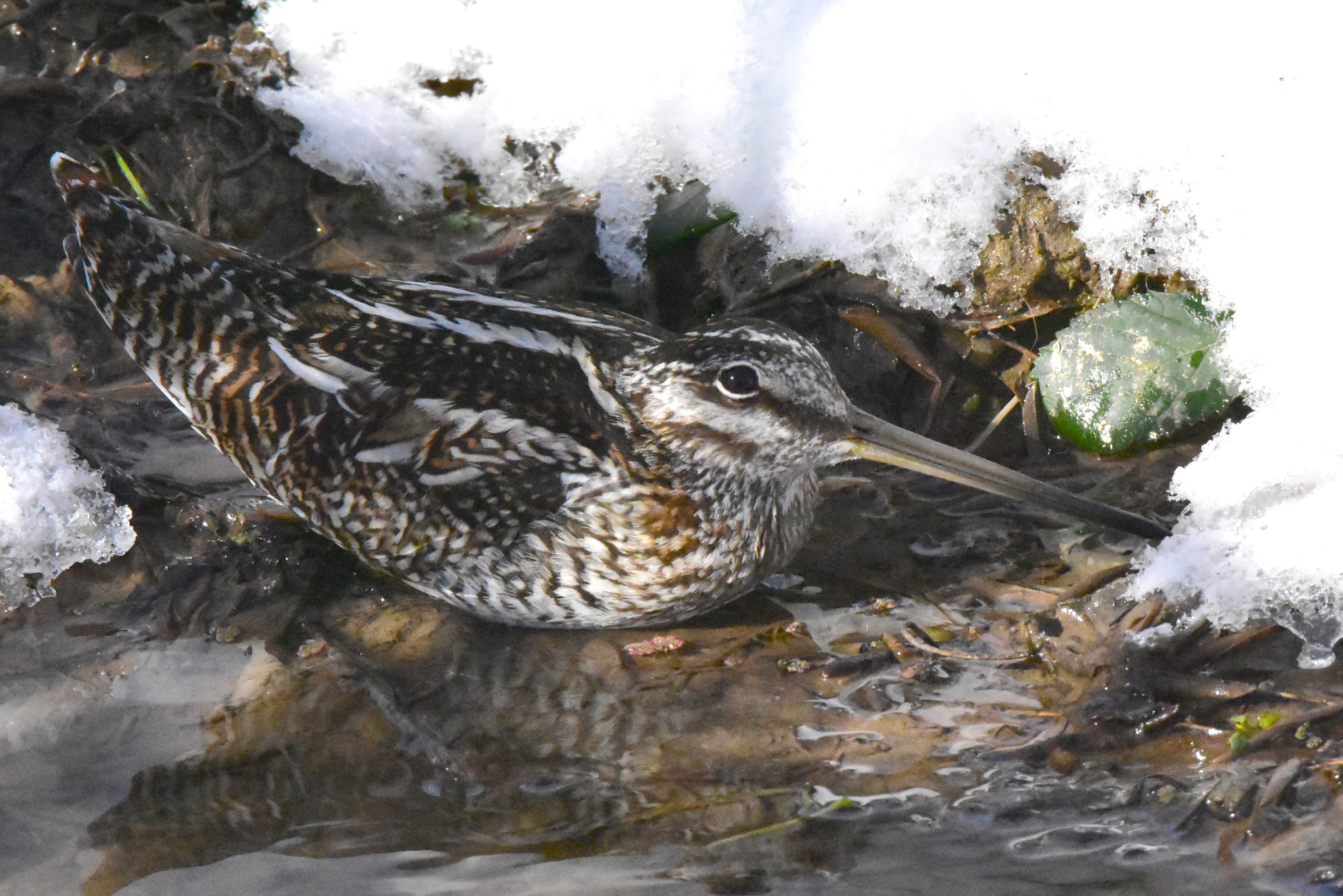

Conservation status
- Least Concern (IUCN 3.1)

Scientific classification
- Kingdom: Animalia
- Phylum: Chordata
- Class: Aves
- Order: Charadriiformes
- Family: Scolopacidae
- Genus: Gallinago
- Species: G. solitaria

Binomial name
- Gallinago solitaria Hodgson, 1831

= Solitary snipe =

Species of bird

The solitary snipe (Gallinago solitaria) is a stocky wader. It is found in the Palearctic from northeast Iran to Korea and Japan.

== Description ==
The solitary snipe is a heavy snipe 29–31 cm long with a stocky body and relatively short legs for a wader. Its upperparts, head and neck are streaked and patterned with medium brown stripes and whitish edges to the feathers forming lines down its back. The face is whitish. The breast is ginger-brown and the belly is white with brown barring on the flanks. The brown and black bill is long, straight and fairly slender. The legs and feet are yellowish-olive to yellowish-brown. All plumages are similar, but females average larger.

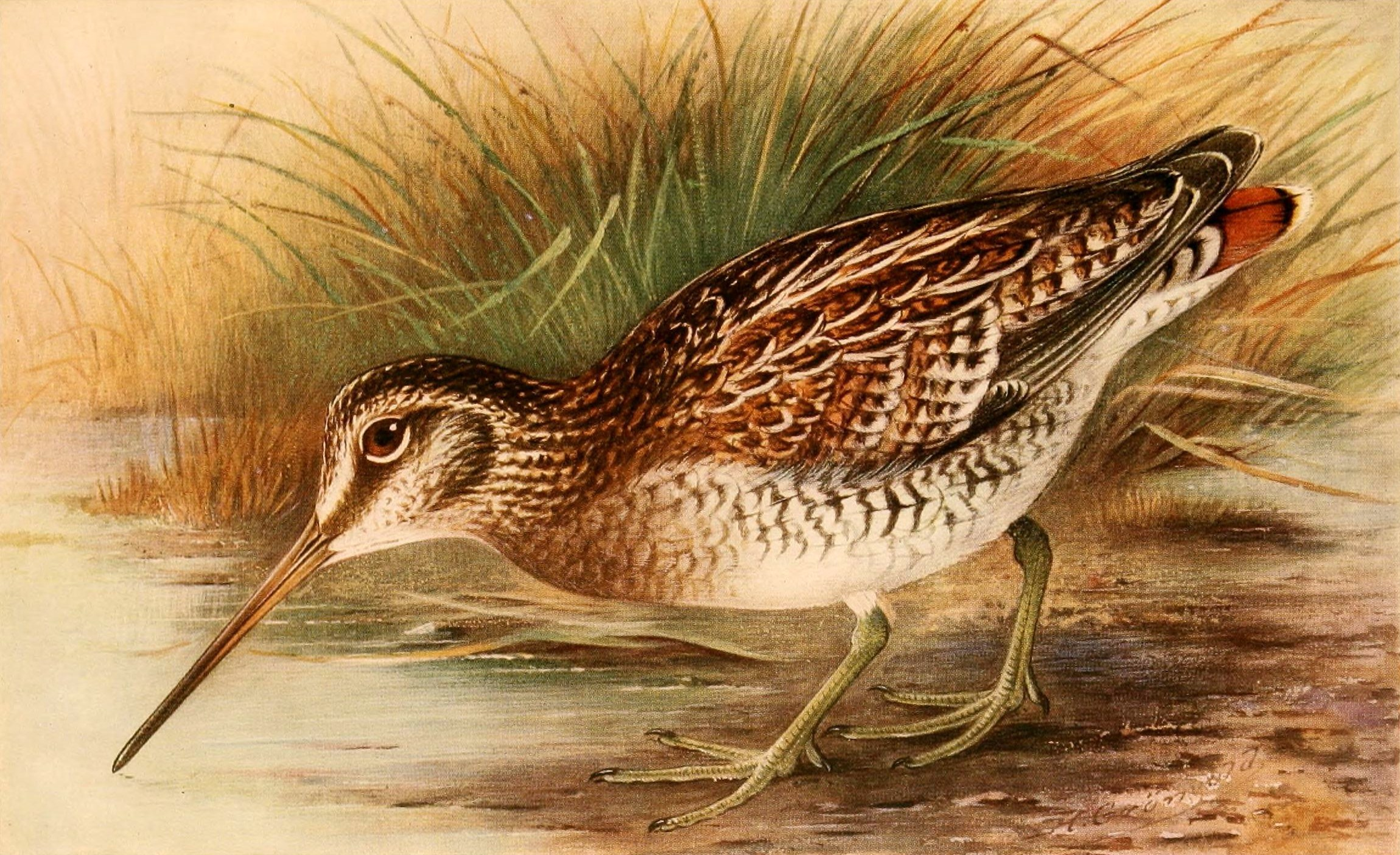
An artist's illustration.

There are two quite similar subspecies. Nominate G. s. solitaria is very widespread. The breeding range of G. s. japonica, which is richer red and less white above, is unknown, but it winters in Japan.

The solitary snipe makes a hoarse kensh call as it takes off, and has a far carrying chok-a-chok-a call when displaying.

The solitary snipe has a relatively slow, heavy flight.

== Distribution and habitat ==
The solitary snipe breeds discontinuously in the mountains of eastern Asia, in eastern Russia, Kazakhstan, Kyrgyzstan and Mongolia. Many birds are sedentary in the high mountains, or just move downhill in hard weather, but others are migratory, wintering in northeast Iran, Pakistan, northern India, Bangladesh, eastern China, Korea, Japan and Sakhalin.

== Behaviour ==
This snipe breeds in mountain bogs and river valleys above the timberline, typically from 2,400 m to 5000 m. It is often found in similar marshes and swamps at lower altitudes when not breeding or on migration.

The solitary snipe builds a saucer-shaped nest of dry grass in the drier areas of its breeding wetland. The nest is concealed in a dense tuft of grass or sedges.

This bird has an aerial display, which involves flying high in circles, followed by a powerful stoop during which the bird makes a "drumming" sound, caused by vibrations of modified outer tail feathers.

The solitary snipe forages by pushing its long bill deep into the mud seeking invertebrates, such as insects and worms, seeds and plants. It is quite approachable, but if alarmed, it crouches, and its cryptic plumage provides effective camouflage when the bird stands motionless amongst marsh vegetation. When flushed, it drops back into the marsh after a short slow flight.

== Images ==
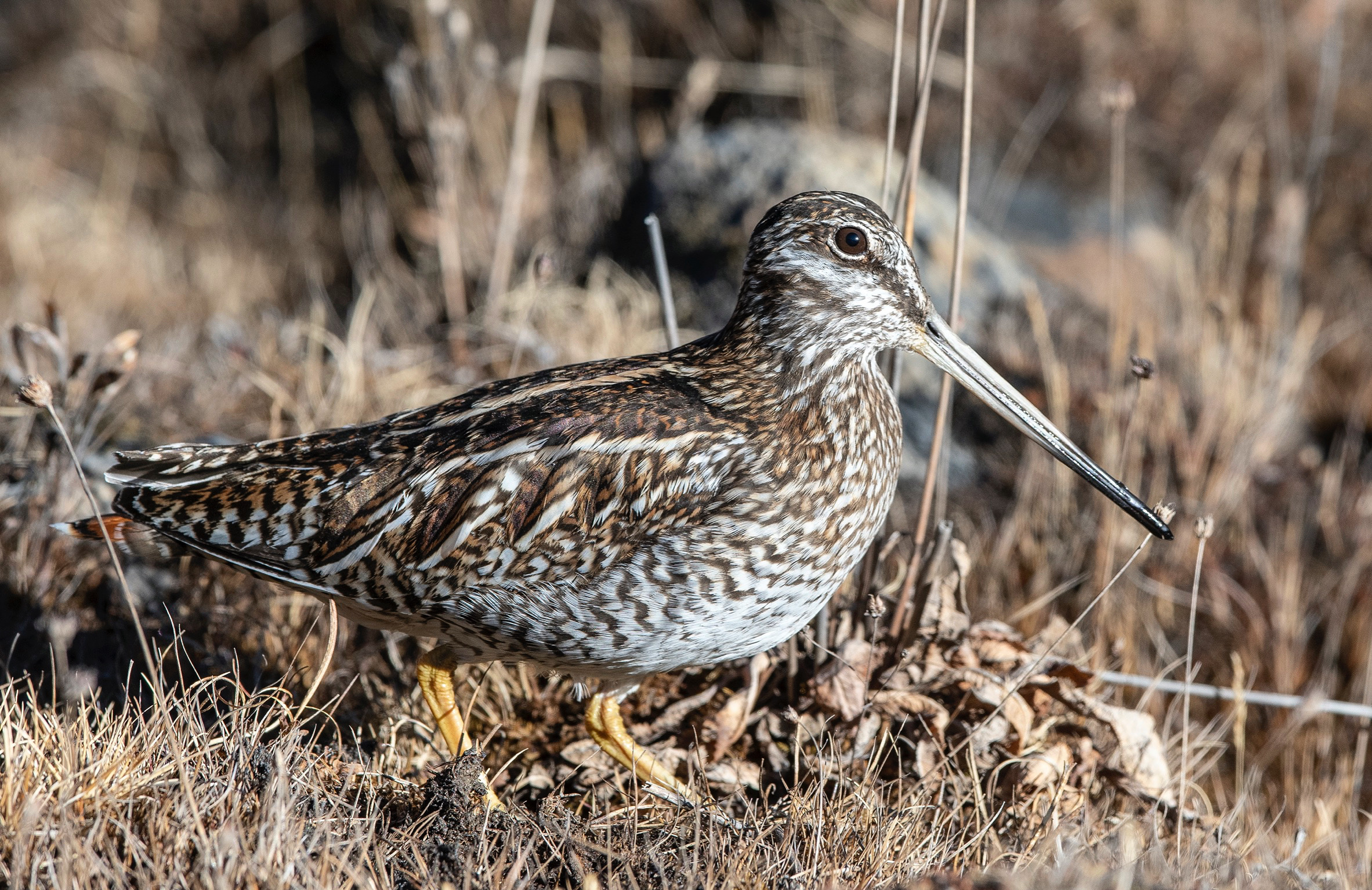
Solitary Snipe
