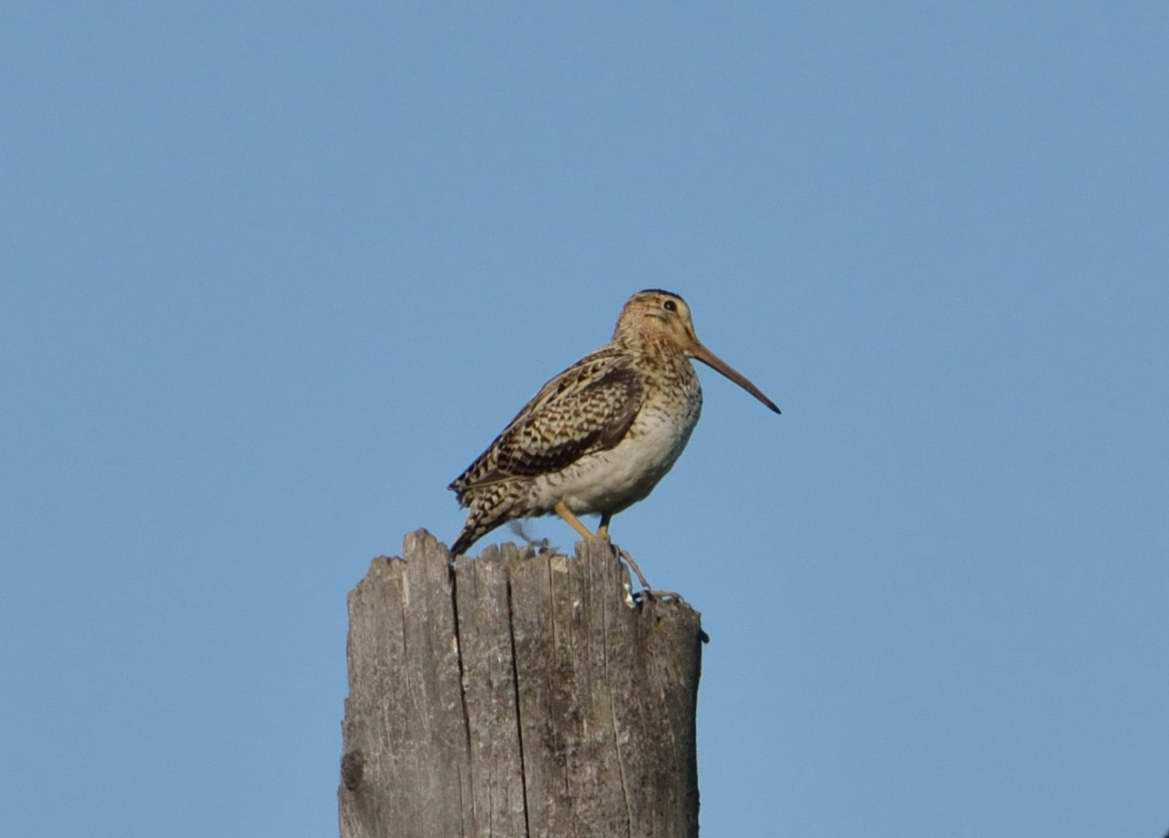

Conservation status
- Least Concern (IUCN 3.1)

Scientific classification
- Kingdom: Animalia
- Phylum: Chordata
- Class: Aves
- Order: Charadriiformes
- Family: Scolopacidae
- Genus: Gallinago
- Species: G. megala

Binomial name
- Gallinago megala R. Swinhoe, 1861

= Swinhoe's snipe =

Species of bird

Swinhoe's snipe (Gallinago megala), also known as forest snipe or Chinese snipe, is a medium-sized (length 27–29 cm, wingspan 38–44 cm, weight 120 gm), long-billed, migratory wader.

The common name commemorates the British naturalist Robert Swinhoe who first described the species in 1861.

== Identification ==
It is identifiable as a Gallinago snipe by its cryptically patterned black, brown, buff and white plumage, but it is not easily distinguished from Latham's and pin-tailed snipe in the field. The species is commonly referred to as a cho suekyung in South Korea.

== Distribution ==
It breeds mainly in central and southern Siberia and Mongolia. The entire population migrates and spends the non-breeding season principally in eastern and southern India, Sri Lanka, south-eastern China, South-East Asia and New Guinea. It has been recorded on migration in eastern China and occasionally in Japan. Records in Australia are mainly from the Top End of the Northern Territory and from north-western Western Australia.

== Habitat ==
Breeding habitat: forest glades and meadows. Non-breeding habitat: shallow freshwater wetlands of various kinds including paddy fields and sewage farms, with bare mud or shallow water for feeding, with nearby vegetation cover.

== Food ==
Mainly small invertebrates including earthworms, mollusks and insects.

== Breeding ==
Display flights and drumming by the males.

== Conservation ==
Because of wide range and no evidence of significant population decline, the species is assessed as being of least concern.
