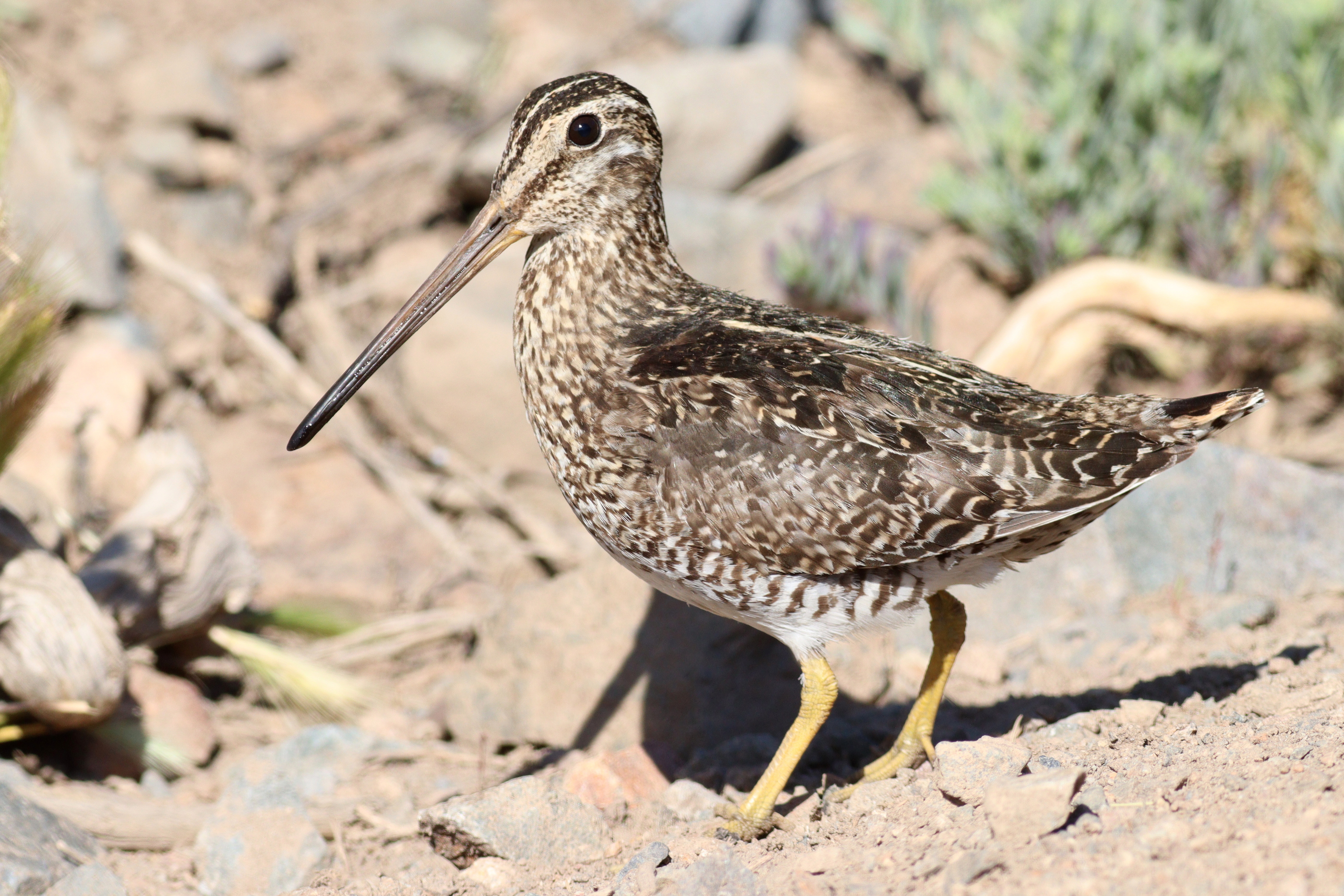

Scientific classification
- Kingdom: Animalia
- Phylum: Chordata
- Class: Aves
- Order: Charadriiformes
- Family: Scolopacidae
- Genus: Gallinago
- Species: G. magellanica

Binomial name
- Gallinago magellanica (King, PP, 1828)

= Magellanic snipe =

Species of bird

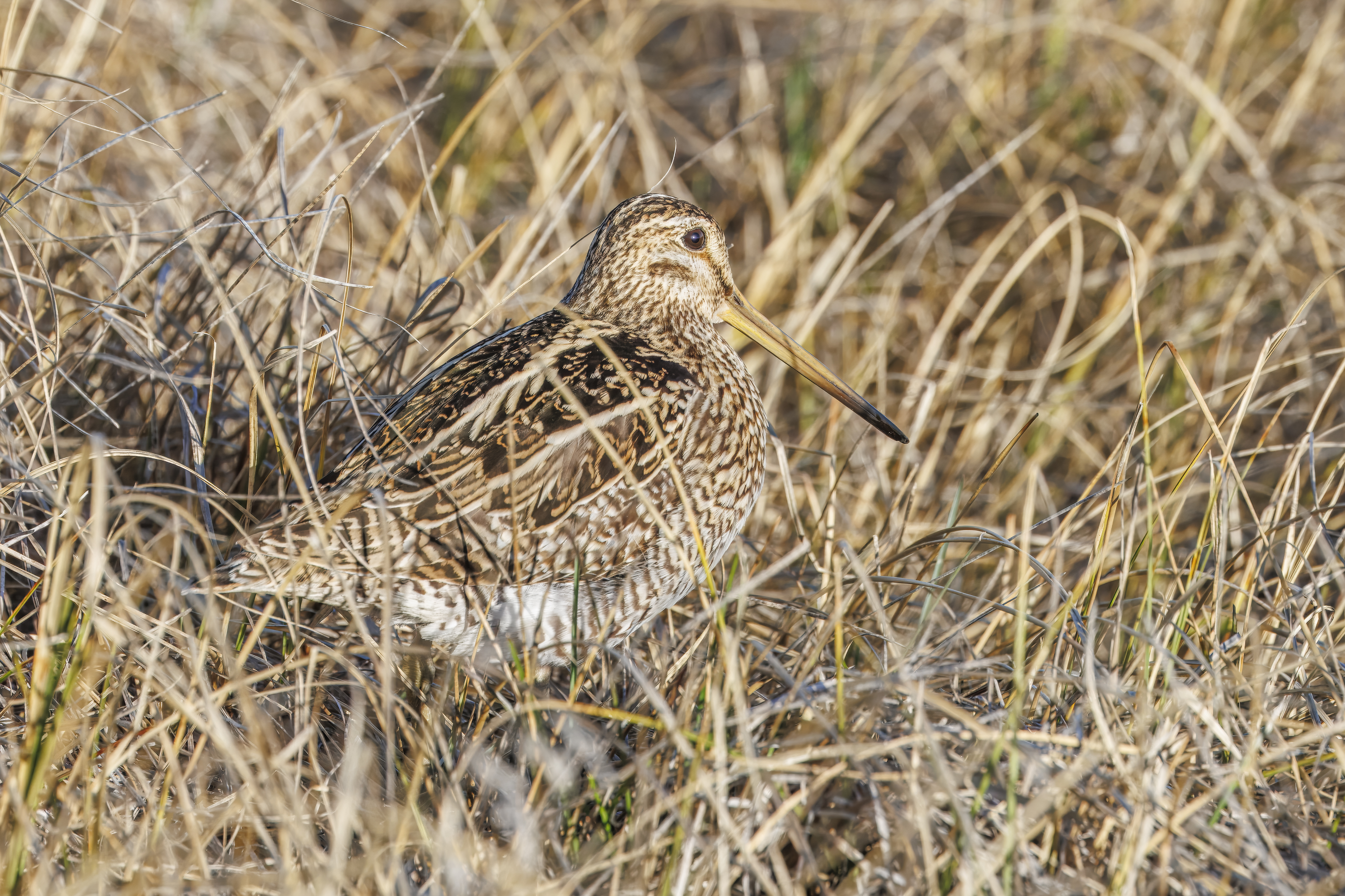
in Argentina

The Magellanic snipe (Gallinago magellanica) is a bird in tribe Scolopancinai and subfamily Scolopacinae of family Scolopacidae, the sandpipers and relatives. It is found in Argentina, Chile, Uruguay, and the Falkland Islands.

== Taxonomy and systematics ==
The taxonomic history of the New World snipes of genus Gallinago is complicated. What is now the Magellanic snipe has in the past been treated as a subspecies of common snipe (G. gallinago), then as conspecific with what are now the Pantanal snipe (G. paraguaiae) and the puna snipe (G. andina), and later still as conspecific with only the Pantanal snipe. The South American Classification Committee of the American Ornithological Society, the International Ornithological Committee (IOC), and the Clements taxonomy treat all of them as separate species. However, BirdLife International's Handbook of the Birds of the World (HBW) retains the Magellanic and Pantanal snipes as subspecies of what it calls the South American snipe, with the binomial G. paraguaiae.

This article follows the IOC definition of a monotypic G. magellanica, the Magellanic snipe.

== Description ==
The Magellanic snipe's face has distinct tan and darker brown stripes. Its upperparts have a complex pattern of muted whitish, buffy, rufous, and black on a brown background. Its breast has fine vermiculation and its flanks have dark and light barring. The upper surface of its tail is rufescent with irregular bars and white tips. It has a long, thick, dull pinkish bill with a black tip. Its legs are yellowish.

== Distribution and habitat ==
The Magellanic snipe is found from north-central Chile and northwestern Argentina south into Tierra del Fuego and also on the Falkland Islands. It reaches Uruguay during the non-breeding season. It inhabits a variety of damp to wet landscapes including pampas, peat bogs, flooded steppe, tussock grasslands, the edges of marshes, and sometimes swampy woods.

== Behavior ==
=== Movement ===
The Magellanic snipe is a partial migrant. The Tierra del Fuego population mostly moves north for the austral winter, as do some individuals of the mainland population. They reach northeastern Argentina and Uruguay at that time. Some birds overwinter on the Falklands but most of that population apparently migrates to the mainland.

=== Feeding ===
The Magellanic snipe forages by probing in mud. Their diet of invertebrates is not known in detail but includes insect larvae and earthworms.

=== Breeding ===
The Magellanic snipe's breeding season varies geographically. On the mainland it appears to span from August to November. On the Falklands it is mainly from August to October. The male performs a winnowing display during courtship, flying high in circles and then taking shallow dives to produce a distinctive sound. The female makes a nest as a shallow depression, usually in grass and close to water. The typical clutch size is two eggs. The incubation period and time to fledging are not known.

=== Vocal and non-vocal sounds ===
The Magellanic snipe has a very wide variety of vocalizations including a chip call "kek..kek..kek..kek..kek...", a chipper call "raspy notes repeated at steady pace ...rek..kek....rek...kek....rek..kek...", a flight call "short raspy note, repeated at irregular intervals ..kek......kek...", and a flush call "KEK.kek.kek.....kek.kek...". The chip and chipper calls are typically made from the ground or near it such as from a fence post. The species' non-vocal winnowing is made by air flowing over the outer tail feathers during flight. It is described as "a series of pulses that increase in duration and amplitude over the sound, with pulses organized as multiples (typically couplets with different duration)." It lasts two to five seconds and is repeated about every 10 seconds.

== Status ==
The IUCN follows HBW taxonomy and so has not assessed Magellanic snipe separately from Pantanal snipe.
