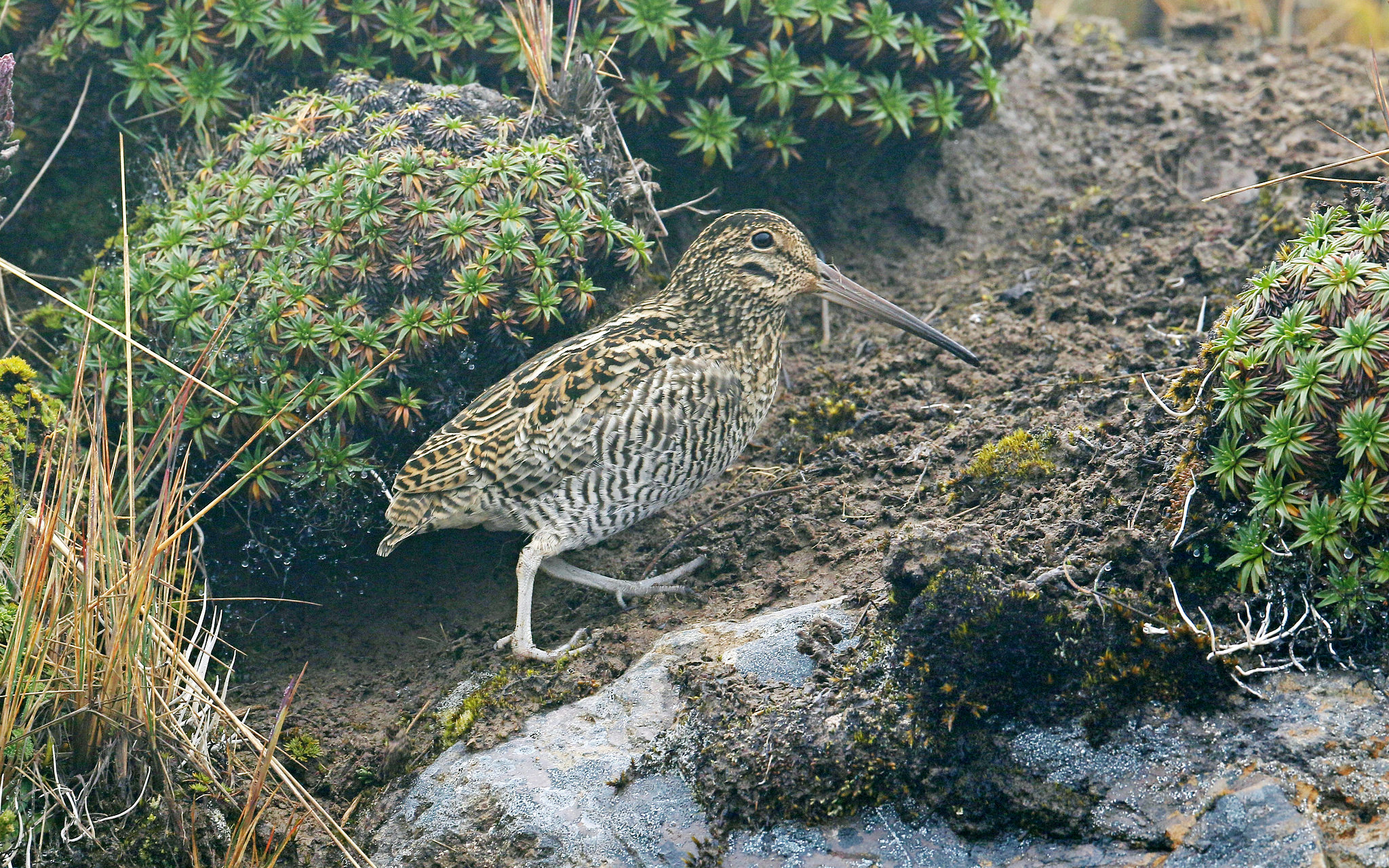

Conservation status
- Least Concern (IUCN 3.1)

Scientific classification
- Kingdom: Animalia
- Phylum: Chordata
- Class: Aves
- Order: Charadriiformes
- Family: Scolopacidae
- Genus: Gallinago
- Species: G. jamesoni

Binomial name
- Gallinago jamesoni (Jardine & Bonaparte, 1855)

= Jameson's snipe =

Species of bird

Jameson's snipe (Gallinago jamesoni or Chubbia jamesoni) or the Andean snipe, is a small, stocky wader. It breeds in the Andes in Bolivia, Colombia, Ecuador, Peru and Venezuela. It appears to be entirely sedentary, with no evidence of migration.

It is sometimes considered conspecific with the Fuegian snipe, Gallinago stricklandii, which is also known as the Cordilleran snipe. The scientific name of the Jameson's snipe commemorates the Scottish botanist William Jameson.

== Description ==
This 30–32 cm long snipe has a stocky body and relatively short legs for a wader. Its upperparts, head and neck are streaked and patterned with warm brown and buff, and the gold edges to the feathers form lines down its back, which are not as sharply defined as in most snipe species. The belly is white with brown barring. The horn-colored bill is long, straight and fairly robust. The legs and feet are yellowish-green. The sexes are similar, and immatures differ only in showing pale fringes on the wing coverts.

The Jameson's snipe makes a whee-tschwu call in its display flight. Compared with other snipes with an overlapping range, Jameson's Snipe is obviously larger, with a heavy woodcock-like flight on broad wings which lack a white trailing edge. On the ground, it lacks the clear pale stripes of its smaller relatives. Furthermore, the puna snipe which occurs in the lower Andes, Gallinago andina, has yellow legs.

== Behaviour ==
The Jameson's snipe is found in marshy areas where grassland and forest intergrade, at altitudes ranging between 2,100 – 3,800 m (mostly 3,000 – 3,500 m). Little is known of its behaviour, but it has an aerial display, which involves flying high in circles, followed by a dive during which the bird makes a drumming sound, caused by vibrations of its modified outer tail feathers.

The Jameson's snipe forages by pushing its long bill deep into the mud seeking insects and worms. Its cryptic plumage provides effective camouflage when the bird stands motionless amongst marsh vegetation.

== Status ==
The Jameson's snipe has a large range, with an estimated extent of 260,000 km², but the population size is unknown. It is probably not rare, but is well concealed by its cryptic plumage and habitat, and difficult to flush. It is usually seen only on its display flight.
