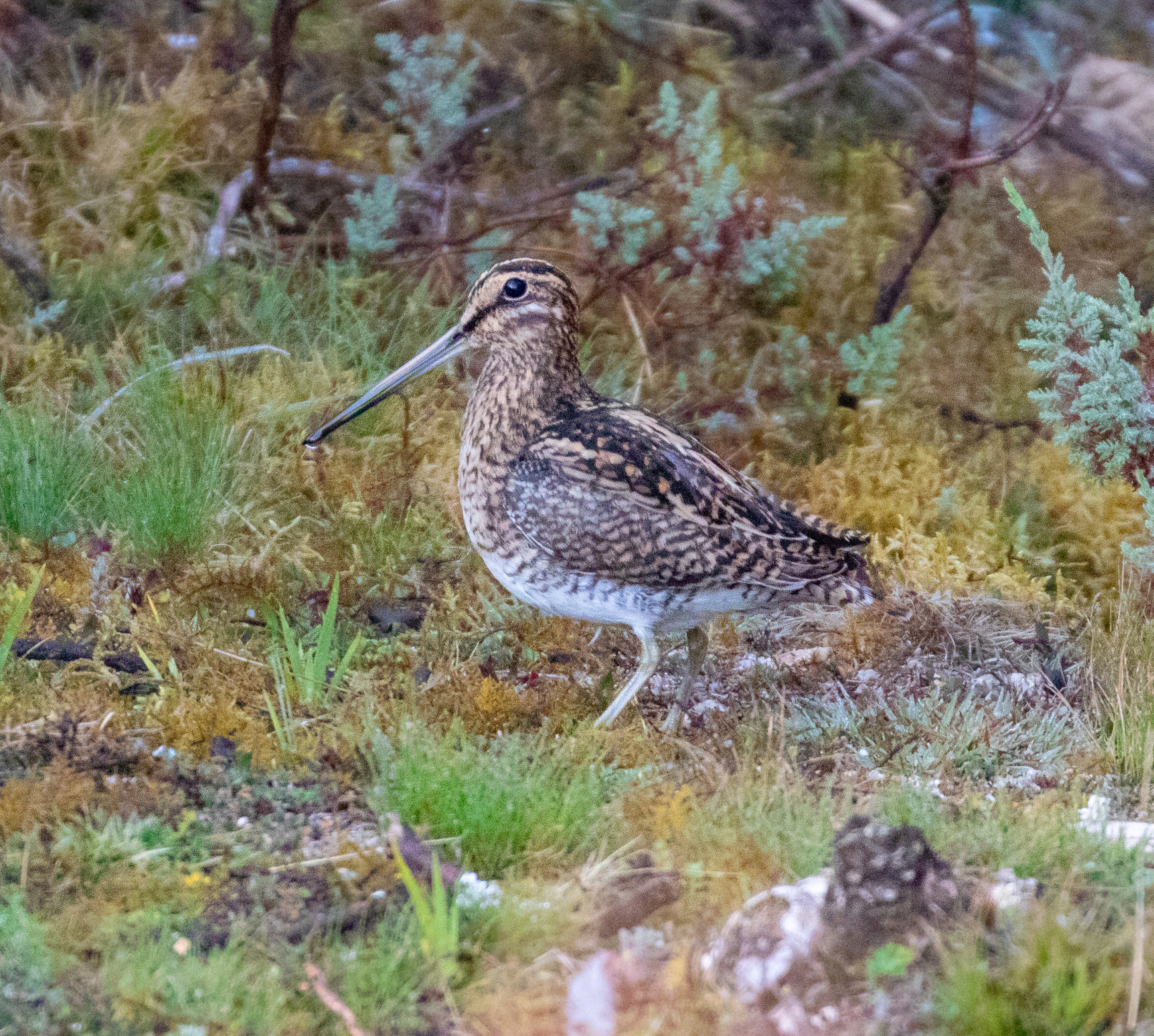

Conservation status
- Least Concern (IUCN 3.1)

Scientific classification
- Kingdom: Animalia
- Phylum: Chordata
- Class: Aves
- Order: Charadriiformes
- Family: Scolopacidae
- Genus: Gallinago
- Species: G. andina

Binomial name
- Gallinago andina Taczanowski, 1875

= Puna snipe =

Species of bird

The puna snipe (Gallinago andina) is a bird in tribe Scolopancinai and subfamily Scolopacinae of family Scolopacidae, the sandpipers and relatives. It is native to the puna grassland.

== Taxonomy and systematics ==
The taxonomic history of the New World snipes of genus Gallinago is complicated. What is now the puna snipe has in the past been treated as a subspecies of common snipe (G. gallinago) with what are now the Pantanal snipe (G. paraguaiae) and the Magellanic snipe (G. magellanica). After the puna snipe was recognized as a species, the Pantanal and Magellanic snipes were sometimes treated as subspecies of it. By about the year 2000 all three were beginning to be recognized as individual species by most taxonomic systems. The current (2022) puna snipe has two subspecies, the nominate G. a. andina (Taczanowski, 1875) and G. a. innotata (Hellmayr, 1932).

== Description ==
The puna snipe is 22.5 to 25 cm (8.9 to 9.8 in) long and weighs 65 to 105 g (2.3 to 3.7 oz). The sexes are alike. Their upperparts have a complex pattern of muted whitish, buffy, rufous, black, and brown. White trailing edges to their wings show when in flight. Their breast and flanks are buff with black markings and the rest of their underparts white. Their white face has a bold brown stripe through the eye.

== Distribution and habitat ==
The nominate subspecies of puna snipe is found in the Andes of Peru, northern Chile, Bolivia, and northwestern Argentina. Undocumented sight records in Ecuador lead the South American Classification Committee of the American Ornithological Society to class it as hypothetical in that country. Subspecies G. a. innotata is found only in northern Chiles's Antofagasta Region.

The puna snipe inhabits the puna grassland zone of the Andes. It favors damp to wet landscapes, such as boggy rivers, cushion plant bogs, the reedy edges of ponds, lakes, and rivers, and sometimes open reed marshes. In elevation it ranges between 3,000 and 4,600 m (9,800 and 15,100 ft) in Peru, between 2,000 and 5,000 m (6,600 and 16,400 ft) in Chile, and between 2,000 and 4,000 m (6,600 and 13,100 ft) in Argentina.

== Behavior ==
=== Movement ===
Some members of the Argentinian population of the puna snipe's nominate subspecies move east onto the pampas during the austral winter. Those in Chile and Peru appear to also move lower but not as dramatically. Movements of G. a. innotata, if any, are not known.

=== Feeding ===
The puna snipe's feeding behavior and diet have not been studied. Both are assumed to be similar to those of other South American Gallinago snipes, which forage for insect larvae and earthworms by probing mud and wet soil.

=== Breeding ===
The puna snipe's breeding season varies geographically. It is mostly between October and December in Peru and includes at least September in northern Chile. The male performs a winnowing display during courtship, flying high in circles and then taking shallow dives to produce a distinctive sound. Nothing else is known about its breeding biology.

=== Vocal and non-vocal sounds ===
The puna snipe sings from the ground "a fast-paced but mellow-sounding 'tip-tip-tip-tip...', 'cut-cut-cut-cut...' or 'dyak dyak dyak .... dyuc dyuc dyuc...'". When taking flight it makes "a sharp, dry 'chep chep chep!', 'che'che'che' or 'dzeetch'". The species' non-vocal winnowing is made by air flowing over the outer tail feathers during flight. It is described as "a long, stuttering whoosh, rendered 'tch'ch'ch'ch'".

== Status ==
The IUCN has assessed the puna snipe as being of Least Concern. It has a fairly large range; although its population size is not known, it is believed to be stable. No immediate threats have been identified. It is considered fairly common in Peru and uncommon in Chile.
