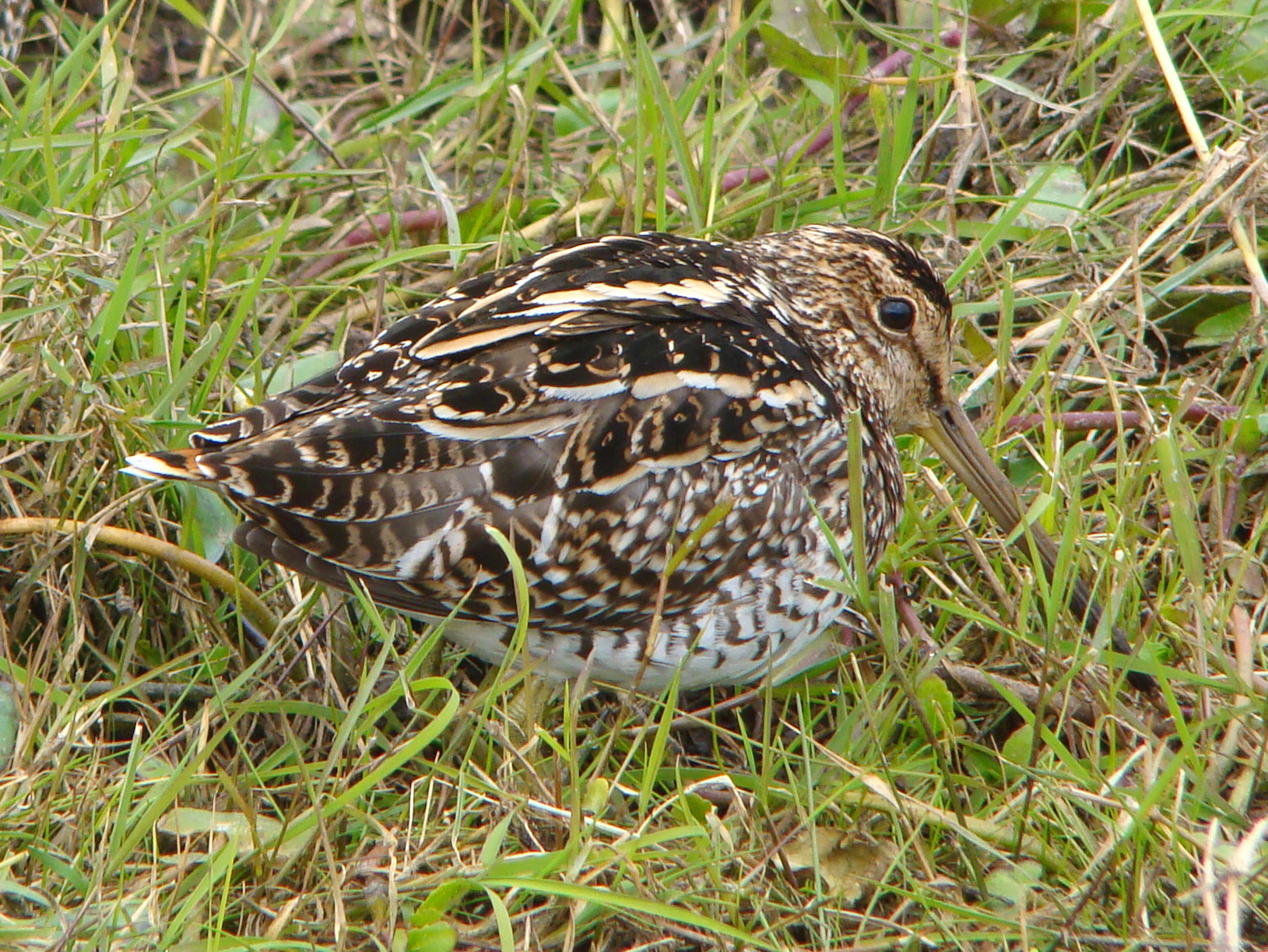

Conservation status
- Least Concern (IUCN 3.1)

Scientific classification
- Kingdom: Animalia
- Phylum: Chordata
- Class: Aves
- Order: Charadriiformes
- Family: Scolopacidae
- Genus: Gallinago
- Species: G. paraguaiae

Binomial name
- Gallinago paraguaiae (Vieillot, 1816)
- Range of Pantanal and Magellanic snipes ("South American" snipe)

= Pantanal snipe =

Species of bird

The Pantanal snipe (Gallinago paraguaiae) is a bird in tribe Scolopancinai and subfamily Scolopacinae of family Scolopacidae, the sandpipers and relatives. It is found on Trinidad and Tobago and in every mainland South American country (though only as a vagrant in Ecuador.)

== Taxonomy and systematics ==
The taxonomic history of the New World snipes of genus Gallinago is complicated. What is now the Pantanal snipe has in the past been treated as a subspecies of common snipe (G. gallinago), then as conspecific with what are now the Magellanic snipe (G. magellanica) and the puna snipe (G. andina), and later still as conspecific with only the Magellanic snipe. The South American Classification Committee of the American Ornithological Society, the International Ornithological Committee (IOC), and the Clements taxonomy treat all of them as separate species. However, BirdLife International's Handbook of the Birds of the World (HBW) retains the Pantanal and Magellanic snipes as subspecies of what it calls the South American snipe, with the binomial G. paraguaiae.

This article follows the IOC definition of a monotypic G. paraguaiae, the Pantanal snipe.

== Description ==
The adult Pantanal snipe is 26 to 30 cm (10 to 12 in) long. Males weigh about 105 to 140 g (3.7 to 4.9 oz) and females 115 to 185 g (4.1 to 6.5 oz). Females are slightly larger than males but otherwise the same. They have short greenish-gray legs and a very long straight dark bill. Their upperparts have a complex pattern of muted whitish, buffy, rufous, and black on a brown background. Their breast and flanks are buff with black markings and the rest of their underparts whitish. Their face has tan and darker brown stripes that blend into each other.

== Distribution and habitat ==
The Pantanal snipe is found in almost every mainland South American country; it is absent from Chile and has been found in Ecuador only as a vagrant. It also occurs on Trinidad and the Falkland Islands. However, it is scarce in the Amazon Basin. It inhabits wet grassy savanna. In elevation it is known as high as 1,300 m (4,300 ft) in Venezuela, as high as 2,200 m (7,200 ft) in Peru, and perhaps as high as 2,600 m (8,500 ft) in Bolivia.

== Behavior ==
=== Movement ===
The Pantanal snipe is essentially sedentary, though some make short movements in winter to find permanent marshes.

=== Feeding ===
The Pantanal snipe forages by probing in mud. Their diet of invertebrates is not known in detail but includes insect larvae and earthworms.

=== Breeding ===
The Pantanal snipe breeds in most of South America away from the Pacific coast and eastern Brazil, and also on Trinidad and the Falkland Islands. Its breeding season varies geographically across its very large range but has not been fully defined anywhere. The male performs a winnowing display during courtship, flying high in circles and then taking shallow dives to produce a distinctive sound. The typical clutch size is four eggs. The nest, incubation period, and time to fledging are not known.

=== Vocal and non-vocal sounds ===
The Pantanal snipe has a very wide variety of vocalizations including a slow chip "kek..kek..kek..kek..kek...", a fast chip "kekkekkekkekkekkekkek", a "short raspy" flight call "..kek......kek...kek-kek...", and a flush call "KEK.kek.kek.....kek.kek...". The chip calls are typically made from the ground or near it such as from a fence post. The species' non-vocal winnowing is made by air flowing over the outer tail feathers during flight. It is described as "a muffled stuttered crescendo series...huhuhuhuhuhu.hu.WHOO..WHOO..WHOO.whu" that lasts about two or three seconds and is repeated about every 10 seconds.

== Status ==
The IUCN follows HBW taxonomy and so has assessed the "South American" (Pantanal plus Magellanic) snipe as a whole. It treats the taxon as being of Least Concern. Though its population size is not known, it is believed to be stable. No immediate threats have been identified.
