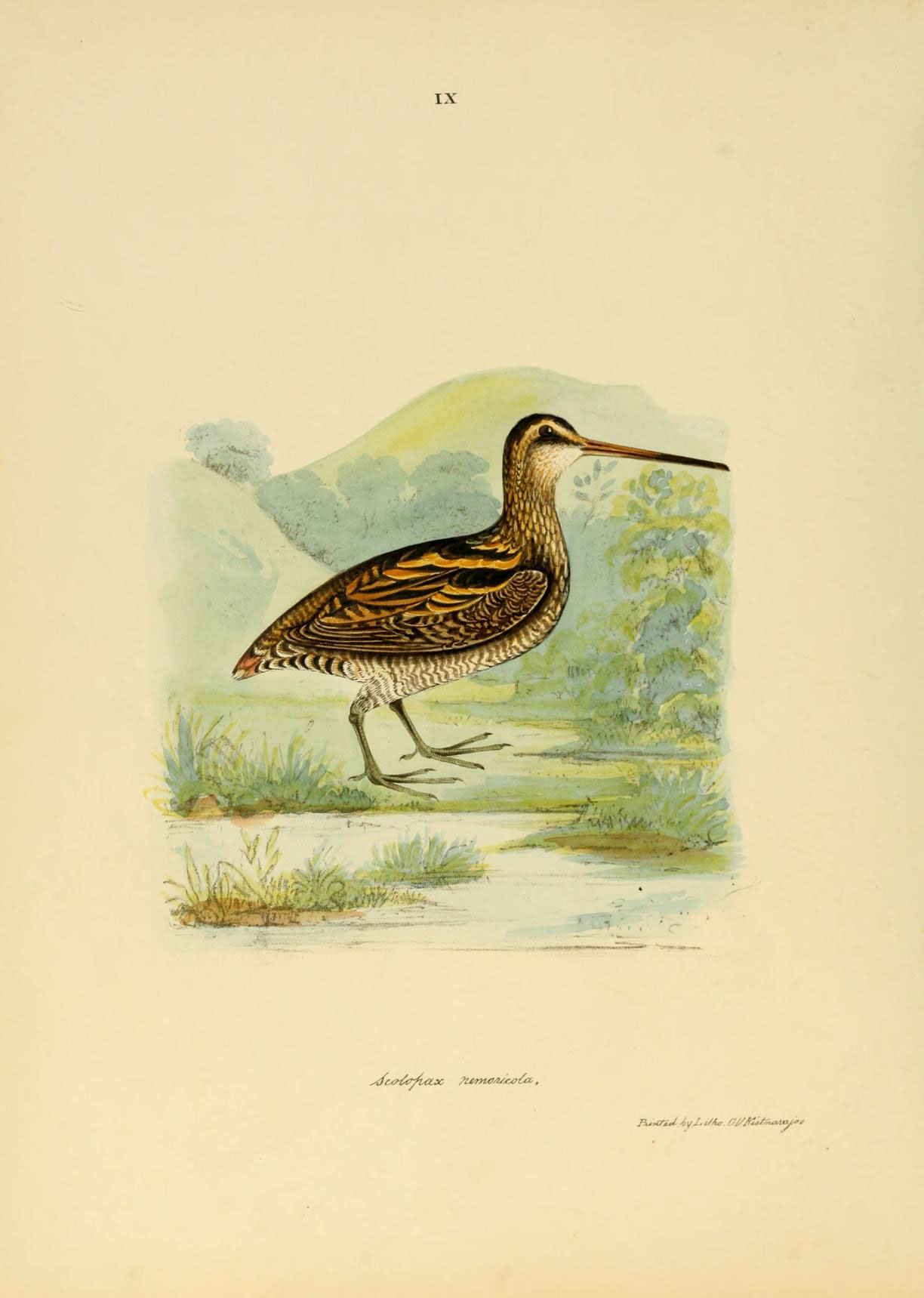

Conservation status
- Vulnerable (IUCN 3.1)

Scientific classification
- Kingdom: Animalia
- Phylum: Chordata
- Class: Aves
- Order: Charadriiformes
- Family: Scolopacidae
- Genus: Gallinago
- Species: G. nemoricola

Binomial name
- Gallinago nemoricola Hodgson, 1836

= Wood snipe =

Species of bird

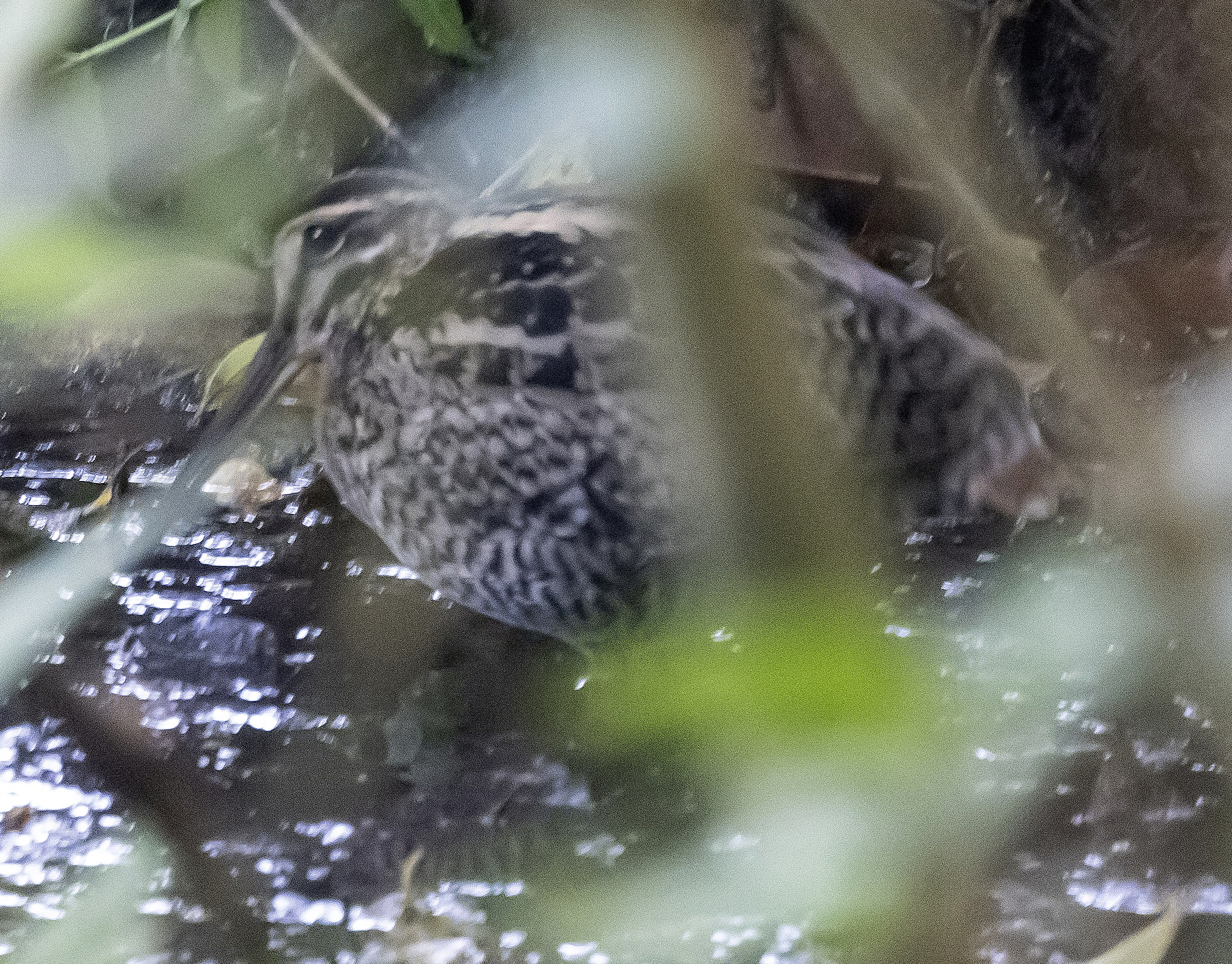
Wood Snipe, Thailand

The wood snipe (Gallinago nemoricola) is a species of snipe which breeds in the Himalayas of northern India, Nepal, Bhutan and southern China. In winter, it occurs at lower altitudes in the Himalayas, as a regular visitor in small numbers to north Vietnam. it also occurs as a vagrant in central and southern India, Sri Lanka, Bangladesh, Myanmar, north Thailand and Laos. It is reportedly very well-known to Chauri herders in the Himalayas.

This is a dark snipe, 28–32 centimetres (11–13 in) in length, with a short, broad-based bill. In the May-July breeding season, it breeds in alpine meadows above 3,000 metres (9,800 ft), moving to lower altitudes in the winter. Wood snipes breed and nest on boulders near rhododendron shrubs. A 2021 study in Sichuan province during the breeding season (May-July), showed that the birds preferred the lower parts (3,378–3,624 m) of the alpine meadow with intermediate levels of soil moisture, with the birds preferring to forage at sites with higher soil fauna abundance.

The species has been classified as Vulnerable by the IUCN, with a population of mature birds between 2,500 and 10,000 as of 2025. The widespread loss of wetlands habitats in its breeding and wintering grounds has been a major reason for its decline. It has been recorded in some protected areas, including Langtang and Sagarmatha National Parks in Nepal.

It eats invertebrates, primarily worms. Its diet also includes seeds and larvae found in Chauri dung.

== Taxonomy ==
It was first described in 1836 by Brian Houghton Hodgson.
