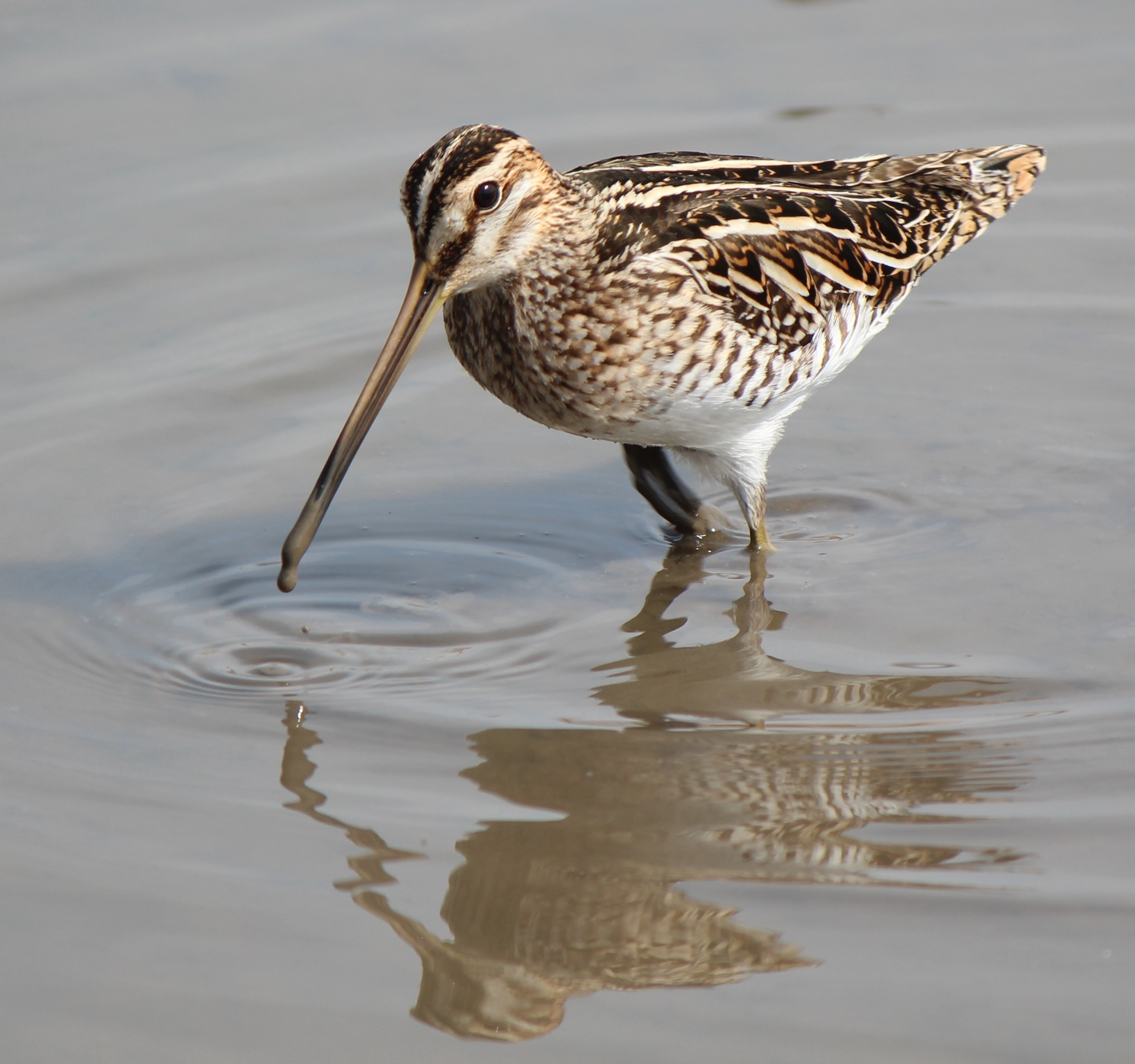
- Common snipe

Scientific classification
- Kingdom: Animalia
- Phylum: Chordata
- Class: Aves
- Order: Charadriiformes
- Family: Scolopacidae
- Genus: Gallinago; Brisson, 1760

Type species
- Scolopax gallinago Linnaeus, 1758

Species
- See text

Synonyms
- Capella

= Gallinago =

Genus of birds

Gallinago is a genus of birds in the wader family Scolopacidae, containing 18 species.

== Taxonomy ==
The name Gallinago was introduced by French zoologist Mathurin Jacques Brisson in 1760 as a subdivision of the genus Scolopax. Brisson did not use Carl Linnaeus's binomial system of nomenclature and although many of Brisson's genera had been adopted by ornithologists, his subdivision of genera were generally ignored. Instead, the erection of the genus Gallinago for the snipes was credited to German zoologist Carl Ludwig Koch in a book published in 1816. But in 1920 it was discovered that the German naturalist Johann Samuel Traugott Frenzel had erected the genus Capella for the snipes in 1801. As his publication antedated Koch's use of Gallinago, it took precedence. The American Ornithologists' Union switched to Capella in 1921 and in 1934, American ornithologist James L. Peters used Capella for the woodcocks in his influential Check-list of Birds of the World. This all changed in 1956, when the International Commission on Zoological Nomenclature ruled that Gallinago Brisson 1760 should have priority for the genus, with the common snipe as the type species. The scientific name gallinago is Neo-Latin for a woodcock or snipe from Latin gallina, "hen", and the suffix -ago, "resembling".

The genus contains 18 species:

Image	Scientific name	Common name	Distribution
	Gallinago imperialis	Imperial snipe	northern Andes
	Gallinago jamesoni	Jameson's snipe	northern Andes
	Gallinago stricklandii	Fuegian snipe	Chile to Tierra del Fuego
	Gallinago solitaria	Solitary snipe	southern Siberia, Mongolia and northern China winters to eastern Alpide belt, northeast Asia and southern China
	Gallinago nemoricola	Wood snipe	eastern Himalayas to central China; winters to southern India and Indochina
	Gallinago media	Great snipe	northwestern palearctic; winters to sub-Saharan Africa
	Gallinago megala	Swinhoe's snipe	Mongolia, southern Siberia and Manchuria winters to Indomalaya and northern Australia
	Gallinago stenura	Pin-tailed snipe	Siberia; winters to Indomalaya
	Gallinago hardwickii	Latham's snipe	Sakhalin and Japan; winters to eastern Australia
	Gallinago nigripennis	African snipe	Sub-Saharan Africa
	Gallinago gallinago	Common snipe	northern palearctic; winters to southern palearctic and Africa
	Gallinago delicata	Wilson's snipe	North America winters to norwestern South America
	Gallinago undulata	Giant snipe	South America
	Gallinago nobilis	Noble snipe	northern Andes
	Gallinago andina	Puna snipe	puna grassland
	Gallinago macrodactyla	Madagascar snipe	eastern Highlands of Madagascar
	Gallinago paraguaiae	Pantanal snipe	South America
	Gallinago magellanica	Magellanic snipe	from Chile to Tierra del Fuego and Falkland Islands

This genus contains the majority of the world's snipe species, the other two extant genera being Coenocorypha, with three species, and Lymnocryptes, the jack snipe. Morphologically, they are all similar, with a very long, slender bill and cryptic plumage. Most have distinctive displays, usually given at dawn or dusk. They search for invertebrates in the mud with a "sewing-machine" action of their long bills.

Fossil bones of some undescribed Gallinago species most similar to the great snipe have been recovered in Late Miocene or Early Pliocene deposits (around 5 mya) of Lee Creek Mine, USA. The large West Indian species Gallinago kakuki went extinct during the late Quaternary period, and despite its distribution, it may actually be more closely related to Old World snipe species than New World ones.
