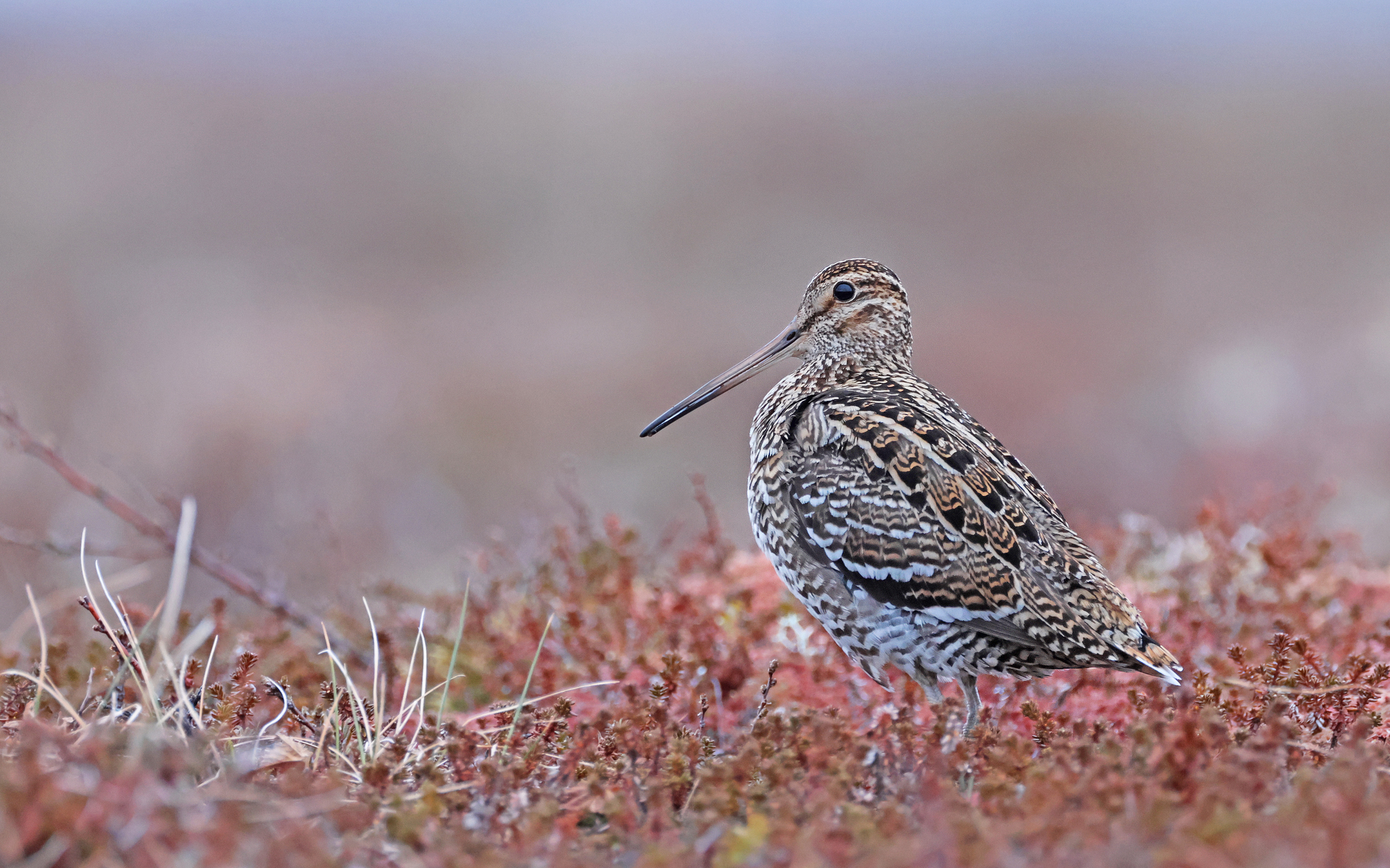

Conservation status
- Near Threatened (IUCN 3.1)

Scientific classification
- Kingdom: Animalia
- Phylum: Chordata
- Class: Aves
- Order: Charadriiformes
- Family: Scolopacidae
- Genus: Gallinago
- Species: G. media

Binomial name
- Gallinago media (Latham, 1787)
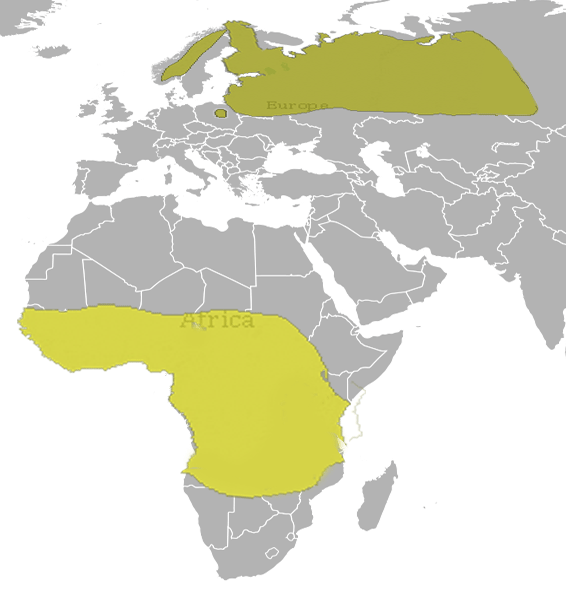
- Range of G. media Breeding range Non-breeding range

Synonyms
- Capella media (Latham, 1787); Gallinago major Scolopax media Latham, 1787

= Great snipe =

Species of bird

The great snipe (Gallinago media) is a small stocky wader in the genus Gallinago. This bird's breeding habitat is marshes and wet meadows with short vegetation in northeastern Europe and northern Asia, from Scandinavia and Poland east across northern Russia to western Siberia, and south to northern Kazakhstan. Great snipe are migratory, wintering in tropical Africa. The European breeding population is in steep decline.

== Taxonomy ==
The great snipe was described by the English naturalist John Latham in 1787 with the binomial name Scolopax media. The name of the current genus Gallinago is Neo-Latin for a woodcock or snipe from Latin gallina, "hen" and the suffix -ago, "resembling". The specific media is Latin for "intermediate", because this species is intermediate in size between the woodcock and the common snipe.

== Description ==
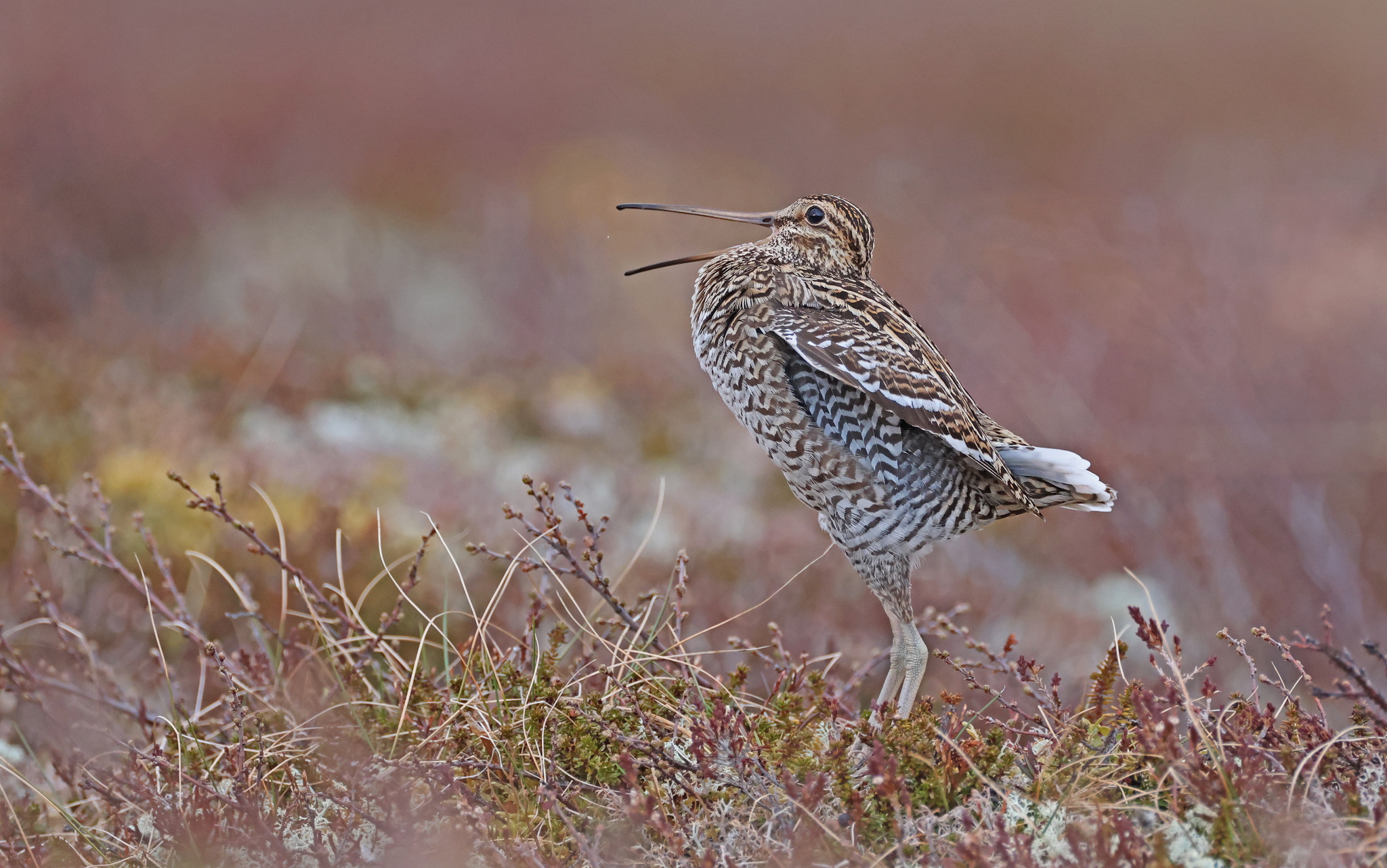
Posture during display

At 26–30 cm (10–12 in) in length and a 43–50 cm (17–20 in) wingspan, adults are slightly larger, but noticeably bulkier, than the common snipe and have a 6–7 cm bill, shorter than that of common snipe. The bird's bulk is most evident in flight, more reminiscent of a woodcock than a common snipe. The body is mottled brown on top and barred underneath. They have a dark stripe through the eye. The wings are broad, and a pale wingbar is visible in flight. The tail has a brown centre and white sides, the white being shown conspicuously during display by fanning the tail.

The voice is described as a faint yeah. Mating display calls of groups can be heard at long distances (more than 300 m (330 yd)) and sound like a mixture of firecracker wind-up xylophone sounds.

== Behaviour and ecology ==
The birds are noted for their fast, non-stop flying capabilities over huge distances. They can fly up to 97 km/h (60 mph), with researchers finding little evidence of wind assistance. Some have been recorded to fly non-stop for 84 hours over 6,760 km (4,200 mi) at altitudes up to 8700 metres. Their wings are not especially aerodynamic, lacking pointed tips, and they typically do not stop to feed despite having opportunities. The birds instead rely on stores of fat.

At dusk during the breeding season, the males display at a lek (arena), standing erect with chest puffed and tail fanned out. They may jump into the air, and will produce a variety of rattles, clicks, buzzes and whistles while displaying. Three to four eggs are laid in a well-hidden nest on the ground.

Great snipe forage in soft mud in dense vegetation, though usually in drier habitats than common snipe; they feed by probing or picking up food by sight. They mainly eat insects and earthworms, and occasional plant material. They are difficult to see, being well camouflaged in their habitat. When flushed from cover, they fly straight for a considerable distance before dropping back into vegetation.

== Migration ==
In their seasonal migrations between Sweden and sub-Saharan Africa, great snipe make non-stop flights of 4,000–7,000 km, lasting 60–90 h. During these flights, great snipe repeatedly changed altitudes around dawn and dusk, between average cruising heights about 2,000 m (above sea level) at night and around 4,000 m during daytime. Most birds regularly flew at 6,000 m and one bird reached 8,700 m, possibly the highest altitude ever recorded for a migrating bird.

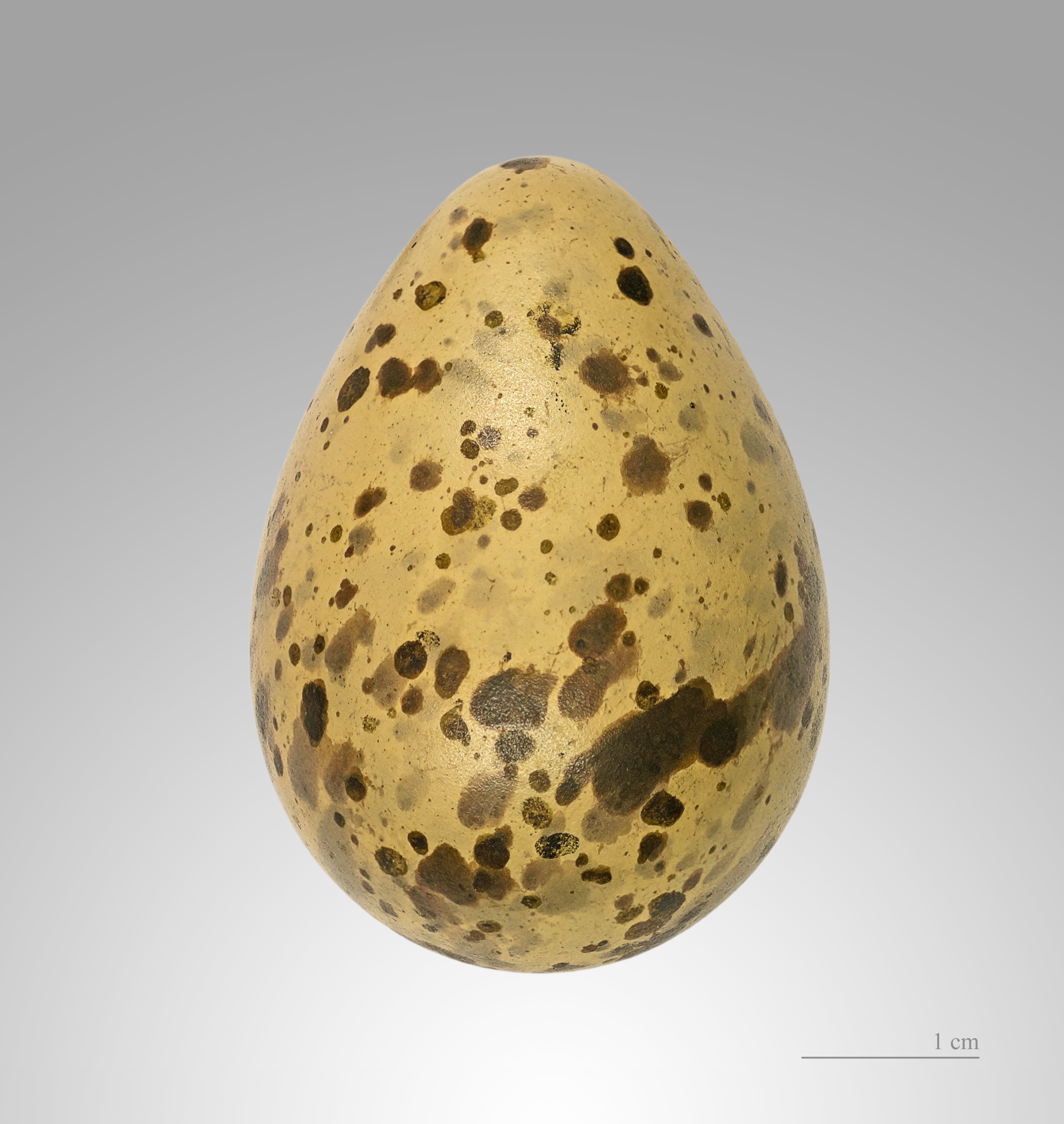
Egg of Gallinago media

== Status ==
As of 2025, global population of great snipe is estimated to be 200,000-380,000 mature individuals, with 13,000-35,000 breeding in Scandinavia and between 191,000 and 344,000 breeding in western Siberia and northeastern Europe. The species is experiencing a population decline (21.1% over three generations), owing primarily to habitat loss, as well as to hunting in eastern Europe and in its African wintering range. The species is classified by the International Union for Conservation of Nature as "Near Threatened". The great snipe is one of the species to which the Agreement on the Conservation of African-Eurasian Migratory Waterbirds (AEWA) applies.
