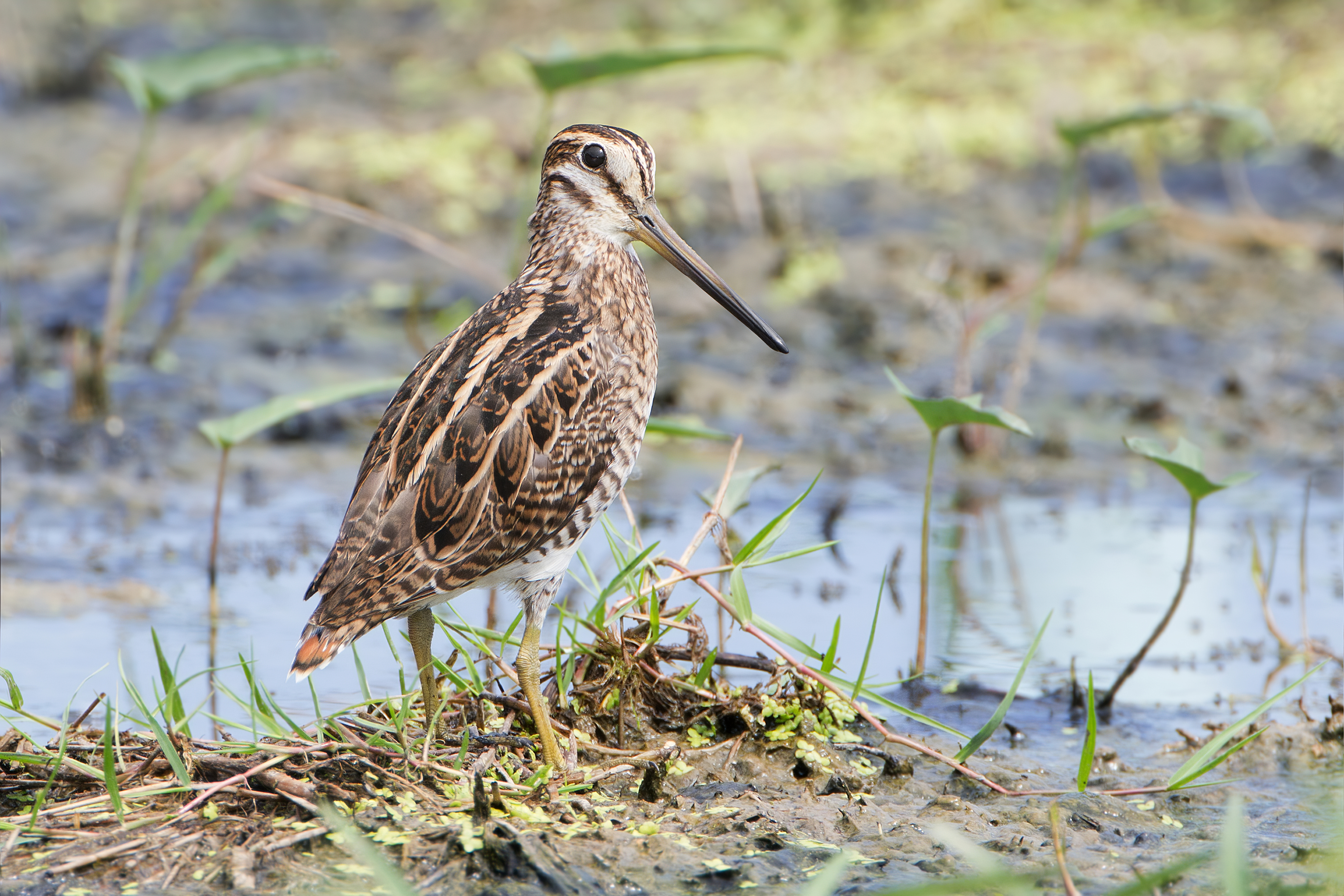

Conservation status
- Least Concern (IUCN 3.1)

Scientific classification
- Kingdom: Animalia
- Phylum: Chordata
- Class: Aves
- Order: Charadriiformes
- Family: Scolopacidae
- Genus: Gallinago
- Species: G. stenura

Binomial name
- Gallinago stenura (Bonaparte, 1831)

Synonyms
- Scolopax stenura Bonaparte, 1831

= Pin-tailed snipe =

Species of bird

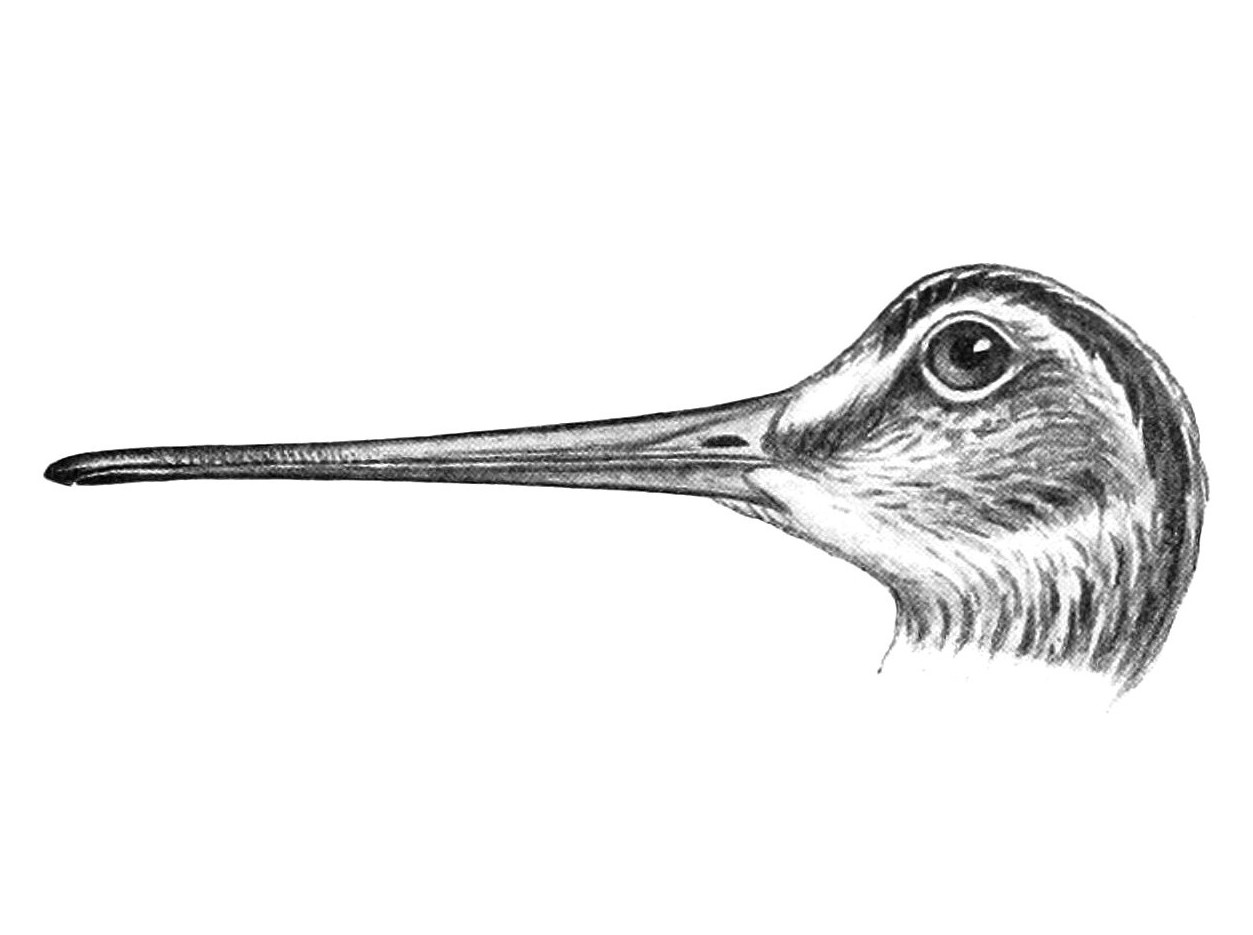
Pintail snipe head and bill

The pin-tailed snipe or pintail snipe (Gallinago stenura) is a species of bird in the family Scolopacidae, the sandpipers.

== Distribution ==
It breeds in northern Russia and migrates to spend the non-breeding season in southern Asia from Pakistan to Indonesia. It is the most common migrant snipe in southern India, Sri Lanka and much of Southeast Asia. It is a vagrant to north-western and northern Australia, and to Kenya in East Africa.

== Habitat ==
Its breeding habitat is damp marshes and tundra in Arctic and boreal Russia. Birds in their non-breeding range use a variety of wetlands, often with common snipe, but may be found also in drier habitats than their relative. They nest in a well-hidden location on the ground.

These birds forage in mud or soft soil, probing or picking up food by sight. They mainly eat insects and earthworms, but also some plant material.

== Description ==
This 25–27 cm long bird is similar to the longer-billed and longer-tailed common snipe. Adults have short greenish-grey legs and a long straight dark bill. The body is mottled brown on top, with cream lines down their back. They are pale underneath with a streaked buff breast and white belly. They have a dark stripe through the eye, with light stripes above and below it. Sexes are similar, and immatures differ only in minor plumage details.

The wings are less pointed than common snipe, and lack the white trailing edge of that species. The shorter tail and flatter flight path when flushed also made flight separation from Common relatively easy.

Male pin-tailed snipes often display in a group, with a loud repetitive tcheka song which has a crescendo of fizzing and buzzing sounds, and also whistling noises produced in flight by the pin-like outer tail feathers which give this species its English name. The normal call is a weak squik.
