= Drumming (snipe) =

Snipe courtship activity

Drumming in the common snipe
Drumming of the common snipe (Gallinago gallinago)

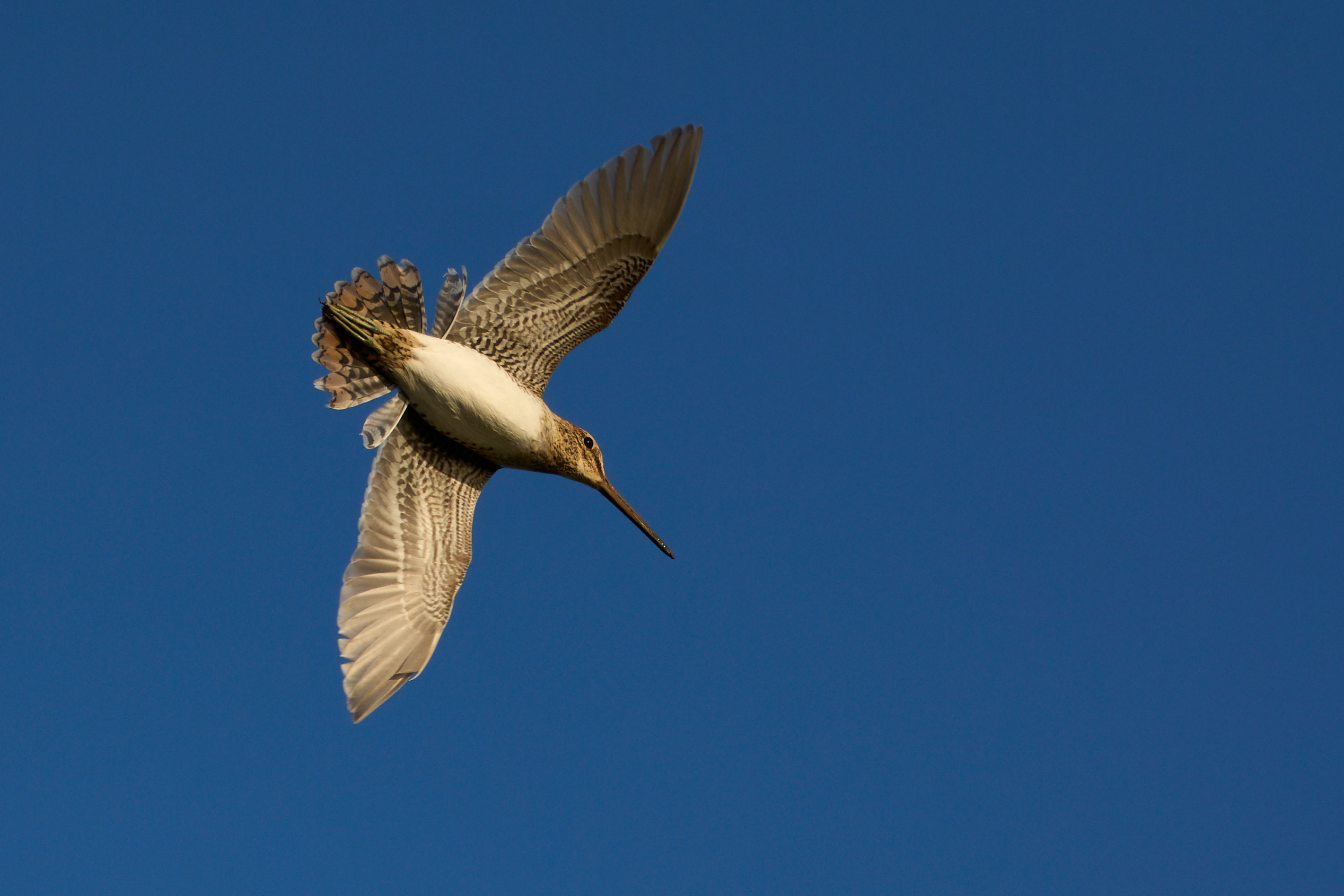
Common snipe (Gallinago gallinago) shown drumming

Drumming (also called bleating or winnowing) is a sound produced by snipe as part of their courtship display flights. The sound is produced mechanically (rather than vocally) by the vibration of the outer tail feathers when flying in a downwards, swooping motion. The drumming display is usually crepuscular, though it can also be heard at any point throughout the breeding season, as well as sporadically during their migration period. Drumming is commonly heard within the context of a mating display, but it can also be displayed as means of distraction when conspecific intruders or potential predators are in the area — this can benefit male snipe in attracting a female mate. The weather can also have an impact on the acoustic properties of drumming — more humid weather will not allow the sound to carry as far and will create a deeper tone.

In looking at drumming in the different genera of snipes, the genus Gallinago (synonym Capella) is the most widely researched. This genus comprises 18 species; however, the two snipe that are the most prominent in research into this group are the common snipe (Gallinago gallinago) in Eurasia and the Wilson's snipe (Gallinago delicata) in North America. Despite being quite similar in their appearance, the common snipe and the Wilson's snipe have several morphological differences that allow for there to be differences in their drumming behaviour; the most obvious difference being that common snipe has seven pairs of rectrices (tail feathers) compared to eight pairs in the Wilson's snipe. The African snipe and Madagascar snipe both have similar drumming to the common snipe, while the pin-tailed snipe from Asia, with 14 pairs of tail feathers (of which the outer seven on each side very slender), produces a highly distinct buzzing sound. Swinhoe's snipe, with usually ten pairs of tail feathers, also produces a distinct drum. Conversely, some species in the genus, such as the great snipe, do not drum at all.

When the discovery was made that this mysterious drumming sound was produced by snipe, there were many naturalists that wanted to learn how the sound was actually being produced, which led to a number of experimental studies. The first of many was conducted in the year 1830 by a German scientist Johann Friedrich Naumann who proposed that the sound was being produced by the wings. A few years later after reading Naumann's proposal, the scientist Friedrich Wilhelm Meves conducted studies that looked in-depth at the tail feathers of snipe. It was eventually confirmed through Meve's experiments that the drumming sound was produced by the tail feathers.

== Function ==
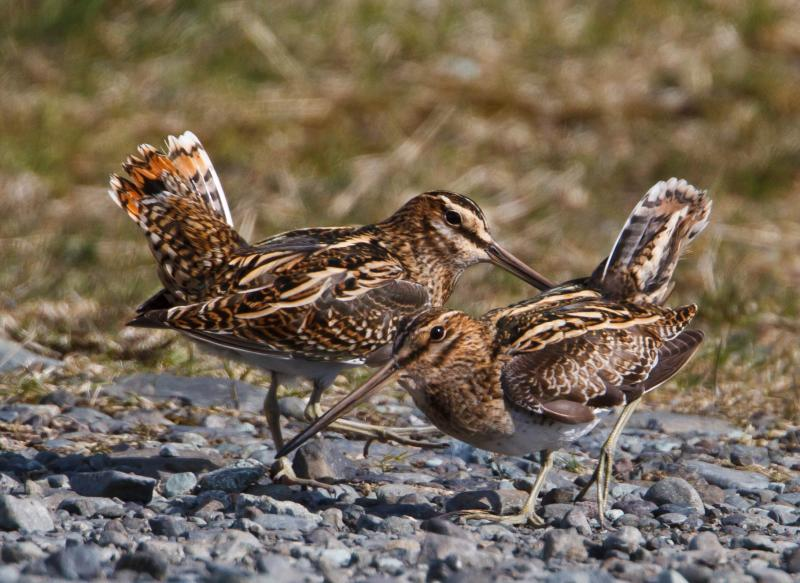
Common snipe (Gallinago gallinago)

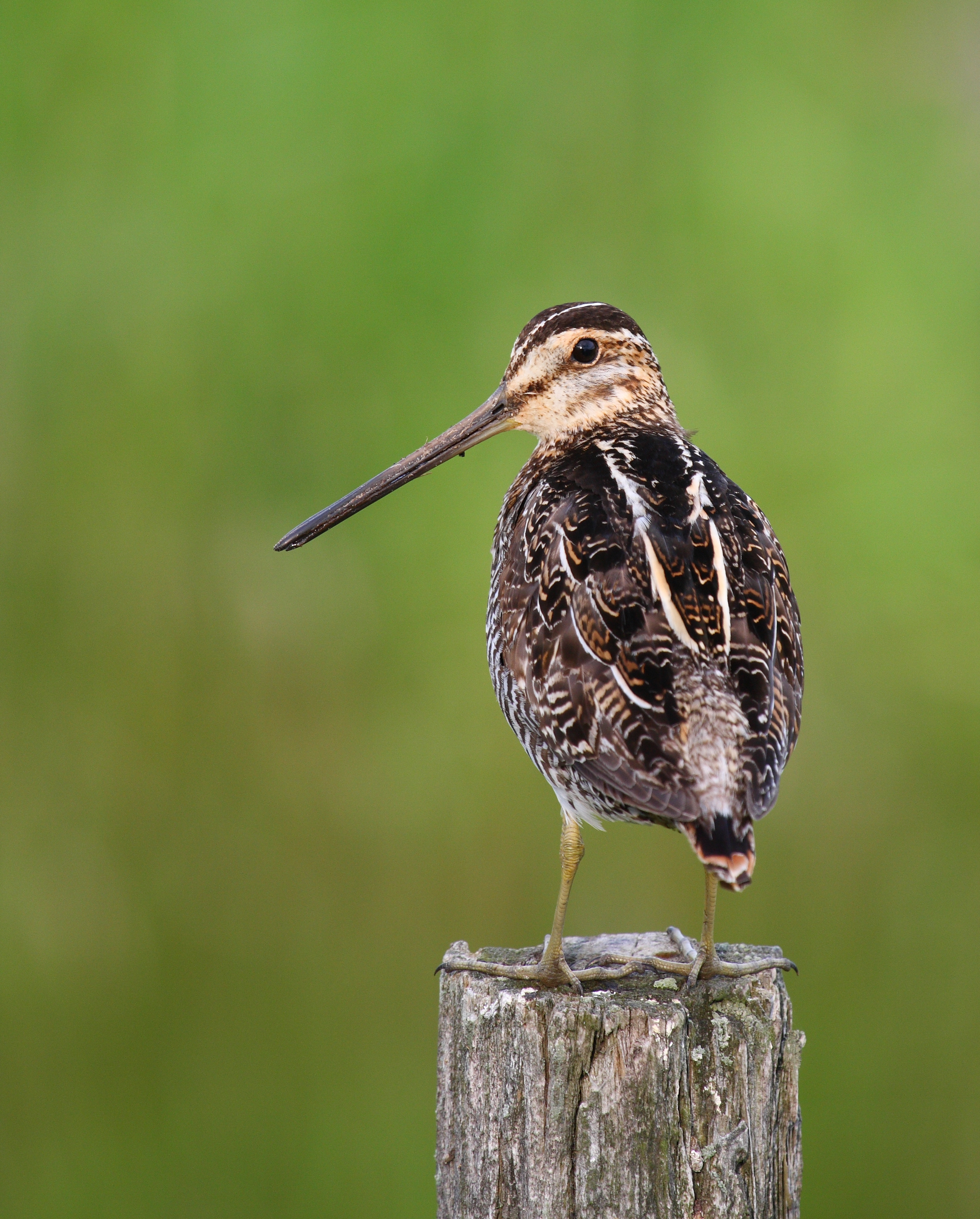
Wilson's snipe (Gallinago delicata)

The drumming sound produced by snipe is usually heard within the context of the mating display, though that is not always the case. These display flights are performed by both sexes in threat contexts as well and appear to be antagonistic in their action, even when directed by males to females. The display flight, sometimes referred to as a winnowing flight, is used in diving at conspecific intruders and potential predators, with the male at times attacking in flight, a clear demonstration of antagonism but can also function to attract females.

=== Performance context ===
Though snipe drum at any point throughout the breeding season, and sporadically during migration periods, the maximum drumming period is during the twilight hours of the evening and morning. Very rarely are snipe heard drumming before dawn, or for as many minutes, after sunset. In looking at the various contexts in which drumming is performed, the most common can be seen in territorial displays. Like during the migration periods, drumming as a territorial display occurs sporadically at any point in the year, though it is most intense on the breeding grounds. These displays are mainly performed by male snipe and they can be distinguished by their frayed middle tail-feathers. Drumming can also be performed in a sexual display over home range. If a snipe is disturbed by a suspected intruder, then they may start drumming as a way to distract the potential threat. This context of drumming can be seen in both male and female snipe during the early part of the breeding season.

=== Weather ===
Depending on weather conditions as well, the acoustic properties of drumming in snipe can vary. For example, if the weather is humid then the drumming sound will not carry as far and the tone will actually be deeper. Weather conditions such as wind, rain or dense fog can also have an effect on the quality of drumming that is produced. In the province of Newfoundland, there is usually a rapid drop in temperature after sunset and a fast rise in temperature after sunrise and this can also effect drumming.

== Mechanics ==
It was once believed that the drumming sound was produced by the vocal organs, though it has since been confirmed that is not the case. The specifics of how this extraordinary sound is produced can be explained by looking at the tail feathers. The sound is generated by vibration of the outer rectrices in the airstream modified by the set of wings. Drumming in G. gallinago and G. delicata begins quite soft, increasing in volume and frequency as the dive progresses, reaching a crescendo just before the dive concludes. Each drum is several seconds in length and is full of rich harmonies.

In looking at the aerodynamics of drumming, the two outer tail-feathers of the snipe, when widely expanded, can actually vibrate without interference from the outer rectrices. In order for the drumming sound to be produced, the snipe must reach a velocity of 40.2 km/h (25 mph) which is required to start the vibration of the outer tail-feathers. In experiments carried out by Carr-Lewty, it was discovered that an air speed of 60.4 km/h (37.5 mph) gave a good indication of drumming at its average pitch; 38.9 km/h (24.2 mph) was the slowest average speed to produce the drumming and 84.2 km/h (52.3 mph) was the speed reached to produce its maximum pitch. Because the outer tail-feathers are somewhat elastic, they are able to bend about their shafts under air pressure. In bending this way, along with the twisting of the outer tail-feathers, the length of the vibration is continuous as long as the required air speed is maintained.

To make sure the feathers are able to withstand the strain of the vibrations, they are very strong in their structure. There have been differences noted between both the outer and inner tail-feathers of the snipe to help better explain the aerodynamic mechanisms that are responsible for its sound production. The outer tail-feathers for example are stronger and much more stiff compared to the inner tail-feathers and they have strong hooks which join the barbules of the rear vane in order to prevent it from breaking at high wind speeds. To ensure that the vibrations occur within a safe limit, the wings of the snipe are used. The quivering of the wings interrupts the flow of air to the tail-feathers during a dive and actually decreases the vibration, which is what allows for the shaky and tremulous quality of the drumming sound.

=== Common snipe ===
The common snipe (Gallinago gallinago) is widespread as a breeding bird across much of northern Eurasia. It ranges from 25 to 27 cm in length and some characteristic traits of their appearance include having horizontal ochre stripes along their back, dark stripes on top of their head, and light underparts which disrupts their plumage and breaks up their shape when they are resting.

=== Wilson's snipe ===
The Wilson's snipe (Gallinago delicata) was historically considered to be both a subspecies of the common snipe and also distinct from it; however, the differences in their drumming display and morphology have, in recent years, allowed for the Wilson's snipe to be classified as having its own specific status. It is similar to common snipe in size or marginally larger, with a total length of 26 to 28 cm and 100 g in weight. Some characteristic traits of their appearance include having a black-striped crown, light-coloured spots that form 4 lines running down their back, and a russet tail.

=== Differences ===
In order to understand why there are differences in the drumming behaviour of the Wilson's snipe compared to the common snipe (Gallinago gallinago), their morphological differences must first be explained. Despite being very similar to the common snipe, there are some morphological differences to note in terms of the Wilson's snipe that includes how they typically have more rectrices (16 vs. 14); their outer rectrices are ≤ 9 mm wide with narrower and more distinct barring. As well, the outer rectrices of the Wilson's snipe are shorter and more narrow than those of the common snipe which contributes to differences in their drumming. Another difference that has been noted is that the tail of the Wilson's snipe extends well beyond its wing-tips. In looking at the drumming difference between the two snipe, the drumming of the common snipe is lower in frequency and modulation rate compared to the Wilson's snipe. The fundamental frequency for G. gallinago is 350–400 Hz with a strong emphasis on odd harmonics, whereas for G. delicata the fundamental frequency is twice as high and its energy falls off with frequency. As well, the drumming of the common snipe has been likened to the sound of a goat or sheep, while the drumming of the Wilson's snipe is pure tremolo.

== Experimental discoveries ==
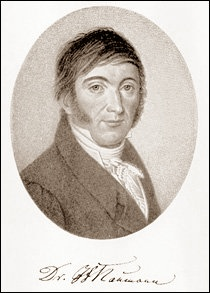
Portrait of the ornithologist Johann Friedrich Naumann

Since learning of the drumming sound that is produced by snipe, many naturalists wanted to try and explain exactly how the sound is made. Johann Friedrich Naumann was one of the many scientists interested in this task and he proposed that the drumming sound was mechanically produced by the wings. Naumann proposed this idea around 1830, and it then became known as Naumann's Wing Theory. It was not until 1846 that an error was discovered within Naumann's proposal, having written schwanzfederspitsen (the German word for the tips of the tail feather) as schwingfederspitsen (which roughly translates to wing feathers). This misprint led to Friedrich Wilhelm Meves to study in-depth the effects of the tail-feathers. To do this, Meves attached the tail-feathers to the end of a long stick and swung both the stick and the feathers through the air, which eventually led to him concluding that the tail-feathers were in fact the producing agents of the drumming sound. In conducting this experiment, Meves observed that the drumming sound was only ever produced when the bird was flying in a downwards, swooping motion with its tail spread out, never when the bird was flying upwards.

Throughout many years of testing various experiments in order to explain exactly how the mechanics of the drumming sound of snipe is produced, Arnold B. Erickson made the concluding statement in 1953 that affirms that the sound is "produced primarily by air vibrating the still outer tail-feathers as the bird spreads them while going into a power dive. The tremulous quality of the sound is an effect of the slow quivering of the wings superimposed on the more rapid vibrations of the tail-feathers".

== Folklore ==
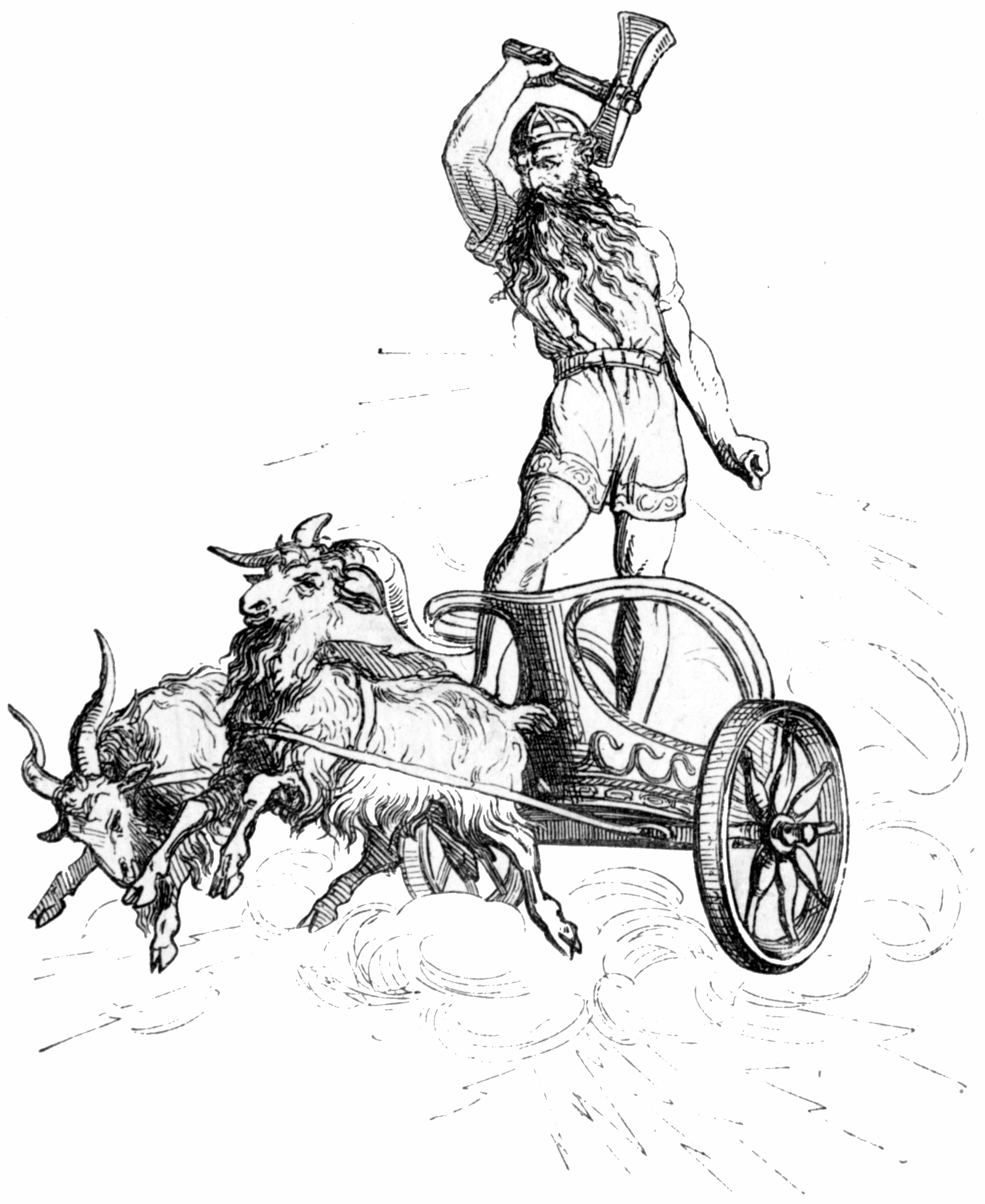
Donar / Thor shown in his chariot pulled by goats

Before the confirmed discovery of the drumming behaviour in snipe, there were many theories and folklore surrounding where this mysterious sound was coming from. A popular belief in parts of Sweden that the sound was from a horse that had been miraculously transported into the sky because they thought the sound was so similar to the whinny of a horse. In northern Germany, people likened the drumming sound to the bleating sound of goats; it was believed that the drumming or bleating of the common snipe at twilight was made by Donar's goats as they pulled his chariot across the heavens. The Nunamiut people of Alaska believed that the drumming of Wilson's snipe resembled the blowing sound of made by walrus, and therefore they referred to the snipe as avikiak for walrus.

In areas of Newfoundland, fishermen have associated the drum of Wilson's snipe with the arrival of lobsters inshore: "when the snipe bawls, the lobster crawls".
