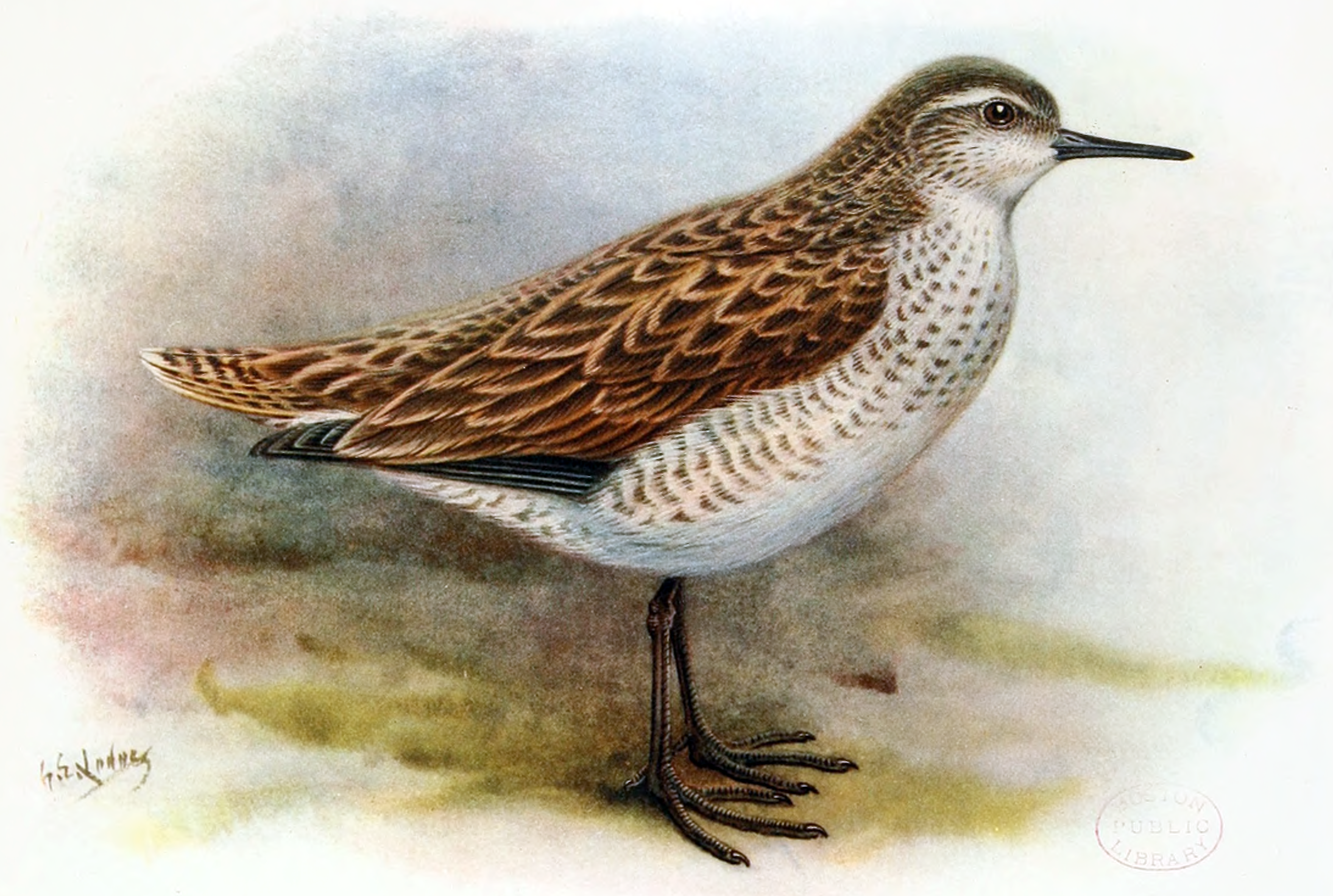
- 1907 illustration by George Edward Lodge

Conservation status
- Extinct (c.1800?) (IUCN 3.1)

Scientific classification
- Kingdom: Animalia
- Phylum: Chordata
- Class: Aves
- Order: Charadriiformes
- Family: Scolopacidae
- Genus: Prosobonia
- Species: †P. cancellata

Binomial name
- †Prosobonia cancellata (JF Gmelin, 1789)

Synonyms
- Tringa cancellata Gmelin, 1789; Aechmorhynchus cancellatus Prosobonia cancellatus Collar and Andrew, 1988; Prosobonia cancellata

= Christmas sandpiper =

Extinct species of bird

The Christmas sandpiper or Kiritimati sandpiper (Prosobonia cancellata) is an extinct species of small shorebird in the family Scolopacidae. It became extinct some time in the first half of the 19th century. It was endemic to Christmas Island (now called Kiritimati), since 1919 a part of Kiribati. It is known solely from a single contemporaneous illustration (by William Wade Ellis), and a description by William Anderson, both made during the third circumnavigation voyage commanded by Captain James Cook, which visited the atoll of Christmas Island between 24 December 1777 and 2 January 1778.

== Taxonomy ==
The Christmas sandpiper was formally described in 1789 by the German naturalist Johann Friedrich Gmelin in his revised and expanded edition of Carl Linnaeus's Systema Naturae. He placed it with the sandpipers in the genus Tringa and coined the binomial name Tringa cancellata. Gmelin based his description on the "Barred phalarope" from Christmas Island that had been described in 1785 by the English ornithologist John Latham in his A General Synopsis of Birds. Latham's specimen had been supplied by the naturalist Joseph Banks. Banks had accompanied James Cook on his first voyage to the south Pacific but had also received specimens from Cook's subsequent voyages. The Christmas sandpiper is now placed in the genus Prosobonia that was introduced by Charles Lucien Bonaparte in 1850. The specific epithet cancellata is from Latin cancellatus meaning "trellis-like" or "lattice-like".

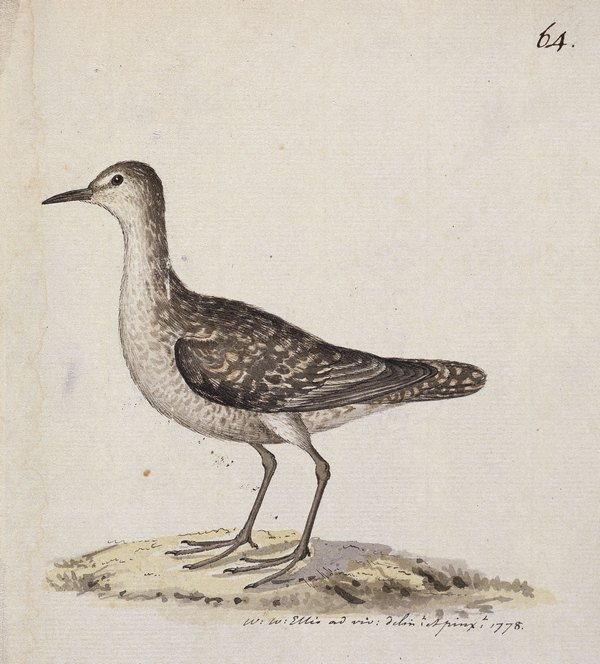
William Ellis' image
