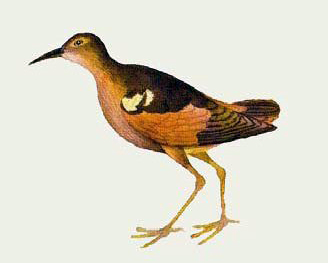
- Illustration by William Ellis, 1777

Conservation status
- Extinct (19th century) (IUCN 3.1)

Scientific classification
- Kingdom: Animalia
- Phylum: Chordata
- Class: Aves
- Order: Charadriiformes
- Family: Scolopacidae
- Genus: Prosobonia
- Species: †P. ellisi

Binomial name
- †Prosobonia ellisi Sharpe, 1906

= Moorea sandpiper =

Extinct species of sandpiper

The Moorea sandpiper (Prosobonia ellisi) is an extinct member of the large wader family Scolopacidae that was endemic to Mo'orea in French Polynesia, where the locals called it te-te in the Tahitian language.

== Description ==
Illustrations of the bird show a somewhat lighter brown bird than the Tahiti Sandpiper, with no white spot behind the eye, a more conspicuous light rusty eye-ring, two white wing-bars and rusty secondary and primary coverts; one of Latham's specimens had yellow legs and feet. The exact relationships between the Moorea and Tahiti specimens are still not fully resolved, with some being unsure if they are separate species.

== Distribution and habitat ==
The Moorea Sandpiper was said to be found "close to small brooks."

== History ==
Two specimens were collected by Georg Forster and William Anderson between September 30 and October 11, 1777, during Captain Cook's third voyage, but both have since disappeared and the bird became extinct in the nineteenth century. Several drawings of the bird were made by those accompanying Cook on his voyage; William Ellis and John Webber both illustrated the sandpiper between August-December 1777.

== Extinction ==
It was still at least moderately common around 1776 - 1779 during Cook's last voyage. Invasive rats may have been a contributing factor in its population decline and extinction.
