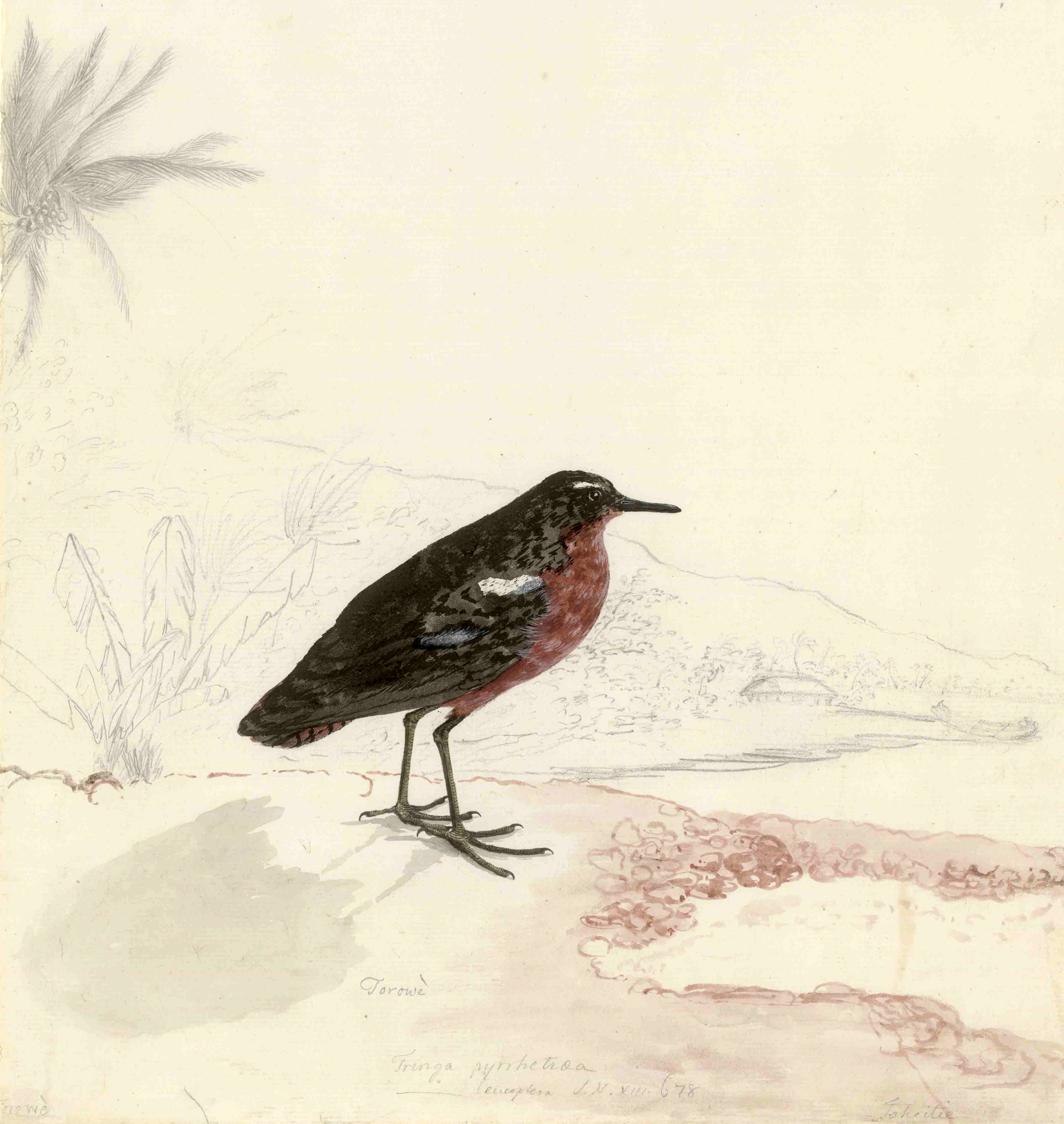
- Forster's drawing, 1772–75

Conservation status
- Extinct (1819) (IUCN 3.1)

Scientific classification
- Kingdom: Animalia
- Phylum: Chordata
- Class: Aves
- Order: Charadriiformes
- Family: Scolopacidae
- Genus: Prosobonia
- Species: †P. leucoptera

Binomial name
- †Prosobonia leucoptera (Gmelin, JF, 1789)

Synonyms
- Tringa leucoptera Gmelin, 1789

= Tahiti sandpiper =

Extinct species of sandpiper

360 degrees image of specimen RMNH.AVES.87556, Prosobonia leucoptera (Gmelin, 1789) from the collection of Naturalis Biodiversity Center.

The Tahiti sandpiper or Tahitian sandpiper (Prosobonia leucoptera) is an extinct member of the large wader family Scolopacidae that was endemic to Tahiti in French Polynesia until its extinction sometime before 1819.

It was discovered in 1773 during Captain Cook's second voyage, when a single specimen seems to have been collected, but it became extinct in the nineteenth century. Only one museum specimen is known to exist, held in the Aves collection of Naturalis Biodiversity Center. The bird's name in the Tahitian language was transcribed as toromē.

== Taxonomy ==
The Tahiti sandpiper was formally described in 1789 by the German naturalist Johann Friedrich Gmelin in his revised and expanded edition of Carl Linnaeus's Systema Naturae. He placed it with the other sandpipers in the genus Tringa and coined the binomial name Tringa leucoptera. Gmelin based his description on the "white-winged sandpiper" that had been described and illustrated in 1785 by the English ornithologist John Latham from a specimen collected in Tahiti. The species is now placed in the genus Prosobonia that was introduced in 1850 by the French naturalist Charles Lucien Bonaparte with the Tahiti sandpiper as the type species. Bonaparte did not explain the etymology of the genus name, but it is likely from the Ancient Greek prosōpon meaning "mask" or "face". The specific epithet leucoptera is derived from Ancient Greek leukopteros meaning "white-winged".

== Description ==
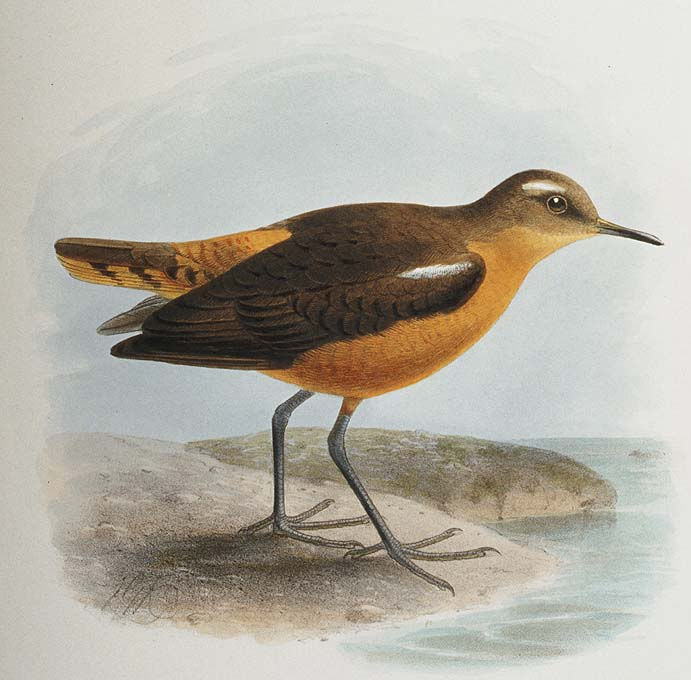
Restoration by Keulemans

Based on Zusi & Jehl (1970): A small (some 18 cm long), plain-colored sandpiper, brown below, darker above, with a white wing patch. Top and sides of head and neck to wings and back sooty brown, darker on back and wings. A small white patch behind and above the eye. Chin buffish white. Lores, rump and underside rusty. Wing coverts with some rusty edging. Remiges with paler inner surfaces. Underside of wing dusky brown with paler edges to coverts. A crescent-shaped white patch formed by tertiary coverts; smaller on the underside of the wing. Ten primaries, twelve rectrices. Central tail feathers sooty brown with rusty tips; outer ones rusty with sooty brown barring.

Bill blackish, lower mandible slightly paler, pointed, thin and short, rather like in an insectivorous passerine than a wader. Legs greenish-hued pale straw color. Toes unwebbed. A slim pale rusty ring around the eye. Iris a very dark brown.

Two probable specimens taken on Moorea by William Anderson between September 30 and October 11, 1777, formed the basis for the description of the Moorea Sandpiper. Three specimens mentioned by John Latham in 1787 all differed from one another, but the single remaining one, RMNH 87556, cannot be positively identified with any of them. How it came into the possession of the museum cannot be retraced with complete certainty, but it probably was acquired in 1819 with other specimens from Georg Forster. There also exists a painting by Forster, drawn from the original specimen.

At any rate, the specimen agrees better with the Tahiti bird in Forster's painting. The Moorea Sandpiper—of which another painting, by William Ellis, and a plate by John Webber, supposed to depict the other specimen, constitute all remaining evidence—differs in the color of wings and head. Whether these two forms were species, subspecies, or simply variants due to age or sex cannot be determined with certainty, but for the present they are more often treated as different species than not. The Tahiti and Moorea Sandpipers are believed to have occurred near small streams.

Bones of a related form have been found on Mangaia in the Cook Islands. It is not likely that they will be studied anytime soon; a scientific description would require either successful extraction and analysis of DNA from both the bones and the Leiden specimen (which would risk being damaged during extraction of the tissue sample), or the collection of a sufficient amount of material from Tahiti or Moorea to determine the Mangaia bird's affiliation by analysis of the osteology.
