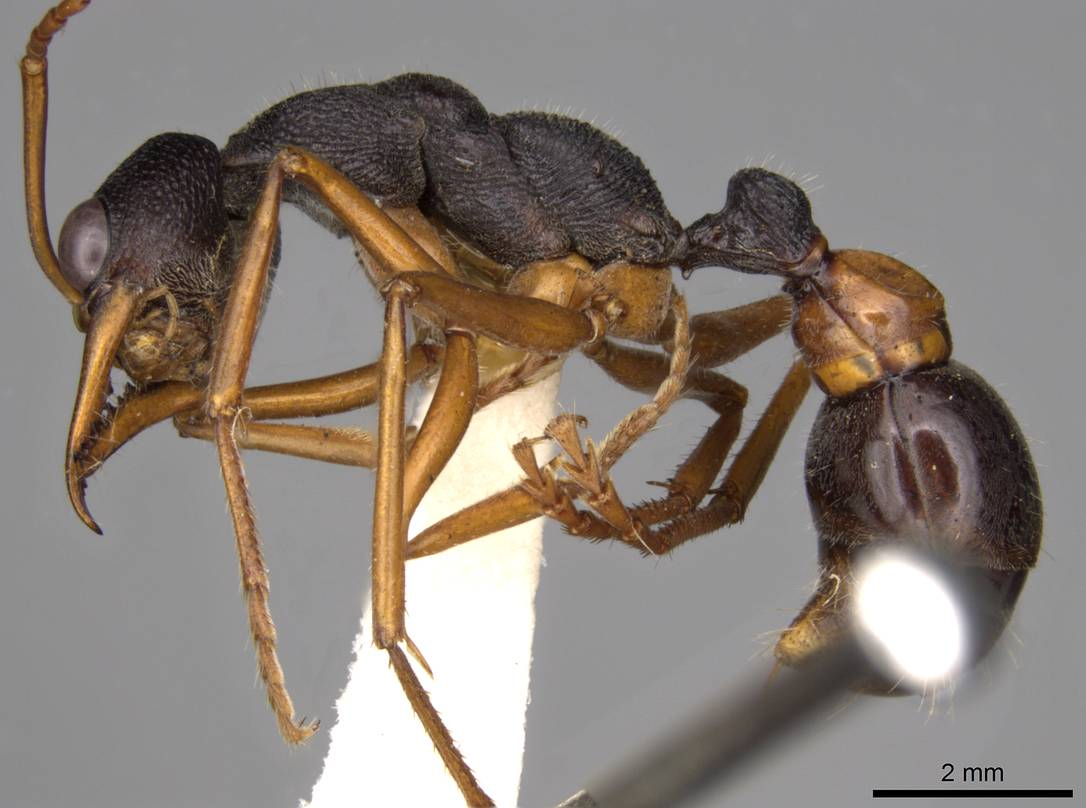

Scientific classification
- Kingdom: Animalia
- Phylum: Arthropoda
- Class: Insecta
- Order: Hymenoptera
- Family: Formicidae
- Subfamily: Myrmeciinae
- Genus: Myrmecia
- Species: M. esuriens

Binomial name
- Myrmecia esuriens Fabricius, 1804

= Myrmecia esuriens =

Species of ant

Myrmecia esuriens, also known as Tasmanian inchman, is a species of bulldog ant native to Tasmania.

== Morphology ==
The largest size of this bull ant species is reached by the queen, about 22 to 24 mm (0.87 to 0.94 in) long. Males ("drones") grow to 16 mm (0.63 in), and the worker ants average 14 to 18 mm (0.55 to 0.71 in) long. Within its genus, M. esuriens is a medium-sized species, as sizes for Myrmecia range from 6 mm (0.24 in) to more than 30 mm (1 in).

The main body of the ant is black with a single segment of the abdomen, the postpetiole, coloured an orange-red. The mandibles, antennae, and legs of the ants are also orange-red. The hair on the ant is yellow, and is short on the head, thorax, and legs and longer on the gaster. No hair is present on the scapes.

The mandibles are long and straight, and of the 11 teeth present, the third, fifth, seventh, and ninth are wider and longer than the other seven. The Tasmanian inchman has good eyesight, useful outside of the nest for defence and foraging.

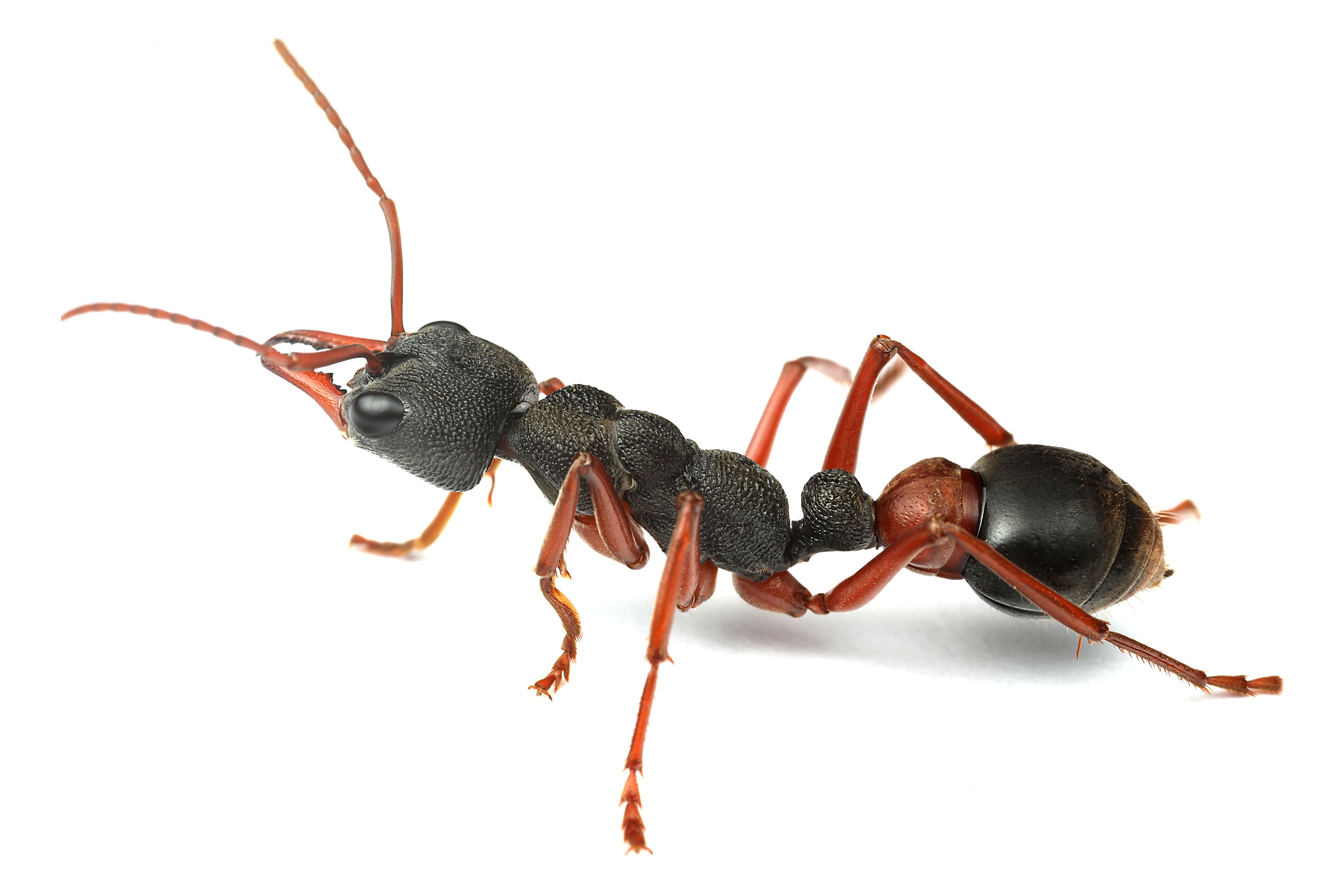
An ergatoid Myrmecia esuriens queen

Unusually for ants, the queens are apterous (i.e., wingless), like workers, thus these queens are called ergatoid (i.e., worker-like) to be distinct from alate queens that have wings. This corresponds with the consideration of the genus Myrmecia as primitive, with several features, such as the presence of ocelli and a well-defined mesonotum, suggestive of earlier evolutionary development.

== Habitat ==
Endemic to Tasmania, the Tasmanian inchman inhabits forest, rocky land, and undergrowth, and can often be found under rocks and fallen trees. They nest in soil, making mounds that are sometimes partially covered by pebbles or vegetation.

== Behaviour and other characteristics ==
The worker ants of the species forage for food in low vegetation and on the ground. Although they themselves are not carnivorous and prefer to feed on nectar and other sweet substances, they do scavenge and hunt prey, which they feed to the ant larvae. Bulldog ants are known for being aggressive and defensive of nests, and sting and use their mandibles to fight off attackers.

Myrmecia esuriens is closely related to M. pilosula, the venomous jack jumper ant, the sting of which is known to be deadly to humans sensitive or allergic to the venom. Although M. esuriens also inflicts stings, no accounts indicate its venom is harmful to humans. This may be due to relative sting strength and composition or possibly due to M. esuriens not being as prevalent or widespread, contributing to a lack of evidence. The sting is painful, however, anecdotal evidence suggests that the pain is short-lived. A folk remedy for the relief of the pain from the sting, known by many people in rural Tasmania, is to break off the fronds of a young braken fern (Pteridium esculentum), which is usually found in the same habitat as M. esuriens, then rubbing the leaves together to extract the sap and applying this to the site of the sting. This remedy is only known to relieve the pain and may not prevent an allergic reaction to the venom.

In January 1777, Captain Cook's ships HMS Resolution and HMS Discovery landed at Adventure Bay, Tasmania. On 30 January, William Anderson, a surgeon and naturalist aboard HMS Resolution, wrote of two "troublesome" insects of Tasmania, one being the mosquitoes and the other "a large black Ant whose bite is almost intolerable for the short time it lasts". The ants stinging Anderson were almost certainly M. esuriens.
