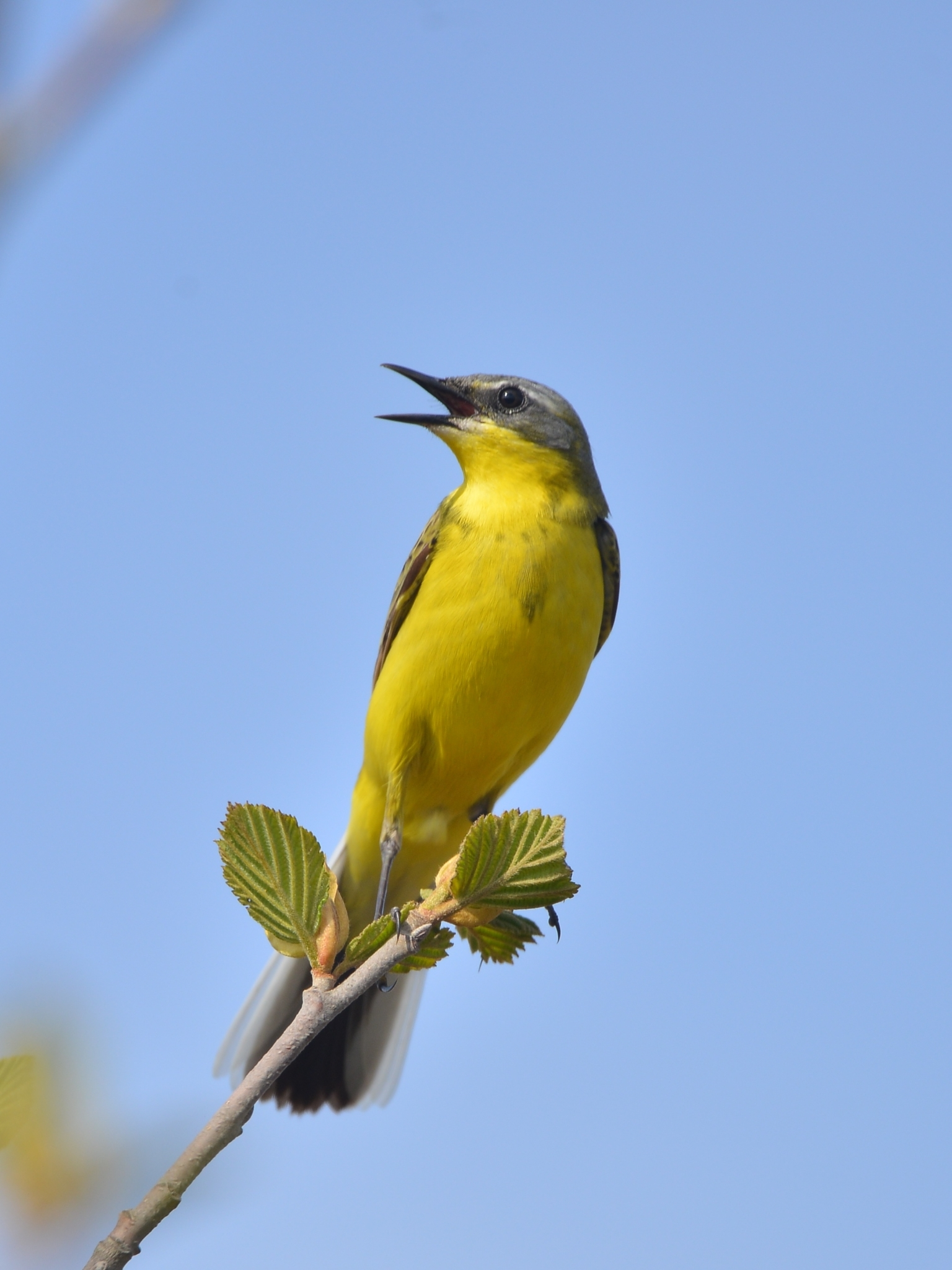
- Male, Kamchatka, Russia
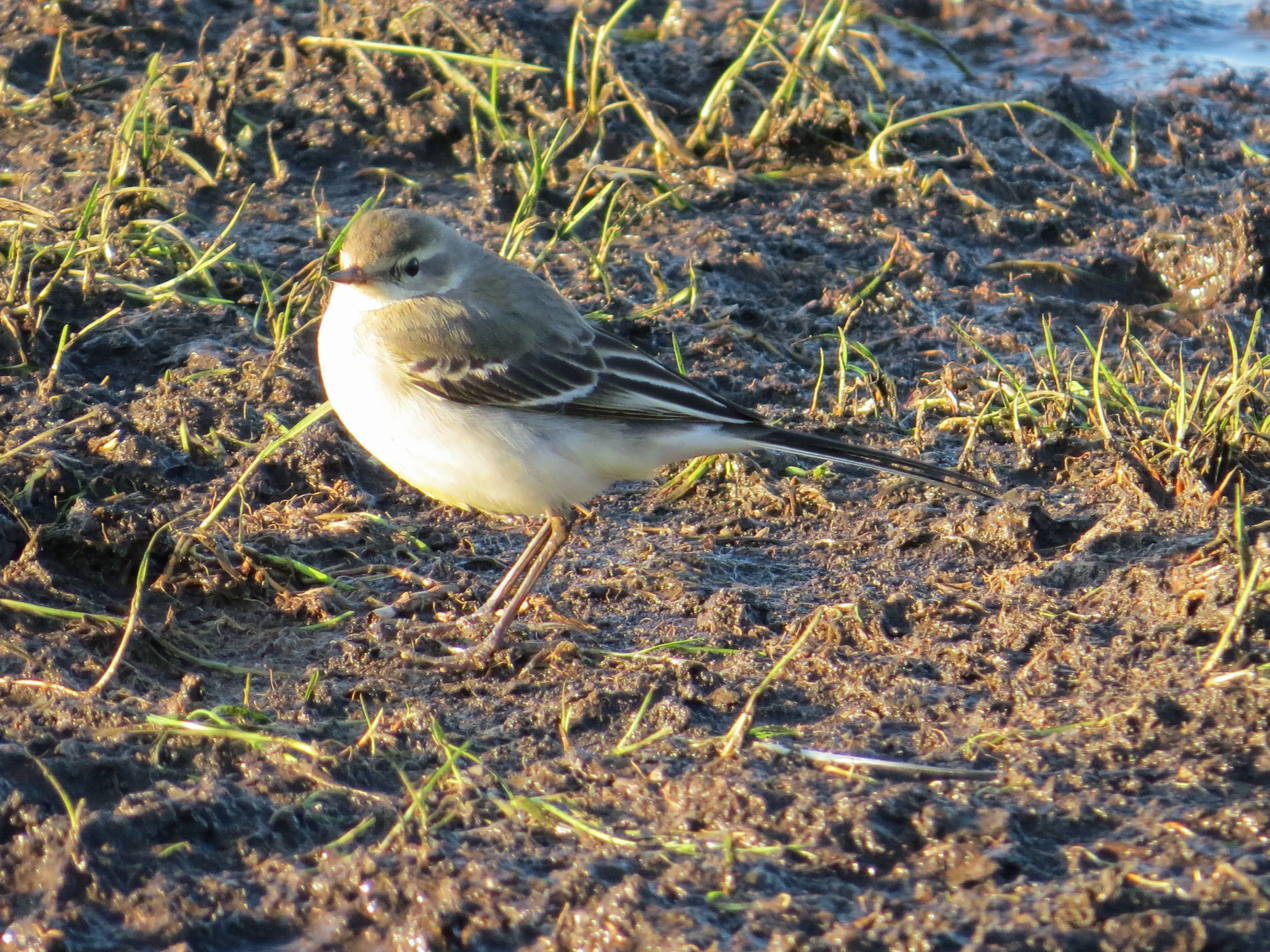
- Female, Northumberland, UK

Conservation status
- Least Concern (IUCN 3.1)

Scientific classification
- Kingdom: Animalia
- Phylum: Chordata
- Class: Aves
- Order: Passeriformes
- Family: Motacillidae
- Genus: Motacilla
- Species: M. tschutschensis

Binomial name
- Motacilla tschutschensis Gmelin, JF, 1789

Subspecies
- four; see text

= Eastern yellow wagtail =

Species of bird

The eastern yellow wagtail (Motacilla tschutschensis) is a small passerine in the wagtail family Motacillidae, which also includes the pipits and longclaws. It was formerly usually classified as a subspecies of the western yellow wagtail, but was split from it in 2003 when genetic data showed this classification to be paraphyletic with respect to the citrine wagtail. It breeds in the eastern Palearctic and Alaska and migrates to South Asia and Australia.

== Taxonomy ==
The eastern yellow wagtail was formally described in 1789 by the German naturalist Johann Friedrich Gmelin in his revised and expanded edition of Carl Linnaeus's Systema Naturae. He placed it with the wagtails in the genus Motacilla and coined the binomial name Motacilla tschutschensis. The specific epithet tschutschensis is from the locality, the Chukchi Peninsula is eastern Russia. Gmelin based his account on the "Tchutschi wagtail" that had been described by John Latham in 1783 and by Thomas Pennant in 1785. In his description Pennant wrote "Taken off the Tchutschi coat, with the Streights of Bering, Lat. 66, north". This is almost certainly the bird captured in 1778 during James Cook's third voyage to the Pacific Ocean. The naturalist William Wade Ellis, who accompanied Cook, produced a painting of the specimen and in the caption wrote "caught on board, lat. 66". Ellis's painting is now in the collection of the Natural History Museum, London.

Four subspecies are recognised:

- M. t. plexa (Thayer & Bangs, 1914) – central north Siberia
- M. t. tschutschensis Gmelin, JF, 1789 – south Siberia, north Mongolia, east Kazakhstan and northwest China to northeast Siberia and northwest North America
- M. t. macronyx (Stresemann, 1920) – central south Siberia, northeast Mongolia and northeast China
- M. t. taivana (Swinhoe, 1863) – southeast Siberia to Sakhalin (east Russia), and far north Hokkaido (north Japan)

Three species of yellow wagtails are recognised in the Palearctic: the eastern yellow wagtail, the western yellow wagtail (Motacilla flava) and the citrine wagtail (Motacilla citreola). Phylogenetic analysis using mitochondrial DNA sequences produces a topology that conflicts with that obtained from when nuclear sequences are used. The topology from nuclear data more closely corresponds to the traditional phenotypic taxonomy. The nuclear genetic divergence between the western and eastern yellow wagtails is small and some ornithologists choose to not split the species so that the eastern races become subspecies of M. flava.

== Description ==
It is a slender 15–16 cm long bird, with the characteristic long, constantly wagging tail of its genus. The breeding adult male is basically olive-green above and yellow below. In other plumages, particularly first-winter birds but also many females, the yellow may be diluted by white. The heads of breeding males come in a variety of colours and patterns depending on subspecies. The bill and legs are black; the hind claw is long and not strongly curved, which distinguishes it reliably from western yellow wagtail which has a shorter, more strongly curved hind claw (though this is often difficult to observe on birds in grass).

The call is a characteristic high-pitched zrri or jeet, shriller and more rasping than the call of western yellow wagtails.

== Distribution and habitat ==
This species breeds in the East Palearctic and has a foothold in North America in Alaska. Most migrate to south-east Asia and Australia in the winter but the non-breeding range extends as far west as eastern India and Sri Lanka. Vagrant individuals can occur away the winter quarters at migration time. For example, on Palau in Micronesia migrant flocks of this species – apparently of the Bering Sea yellow wagtail, and including many adult males – are regularly seen, while further north on the Marianas, only the occasional stray individuals (usually females or immatures) are encountered.

Since the advent of easier DNA testing of droppings and clarification of its identification features, it has proved to be a surprisingly frequent late autumn and winter vagrant in western and northwestern Europe, with ten or more records in some autumns in both Britain and Sweden, and multiple cases of birds overwintering.

== Behaviour ==
This insectivorous bird inhabits open country near water, such as wet meadows. It nests in tussocks, laying 4–8 speckled eggs.

The Acanthocephalan parasite Apororhynchus paulonucleatus was discovered in the colon and cloaca of the eastern yellow wagtail.
