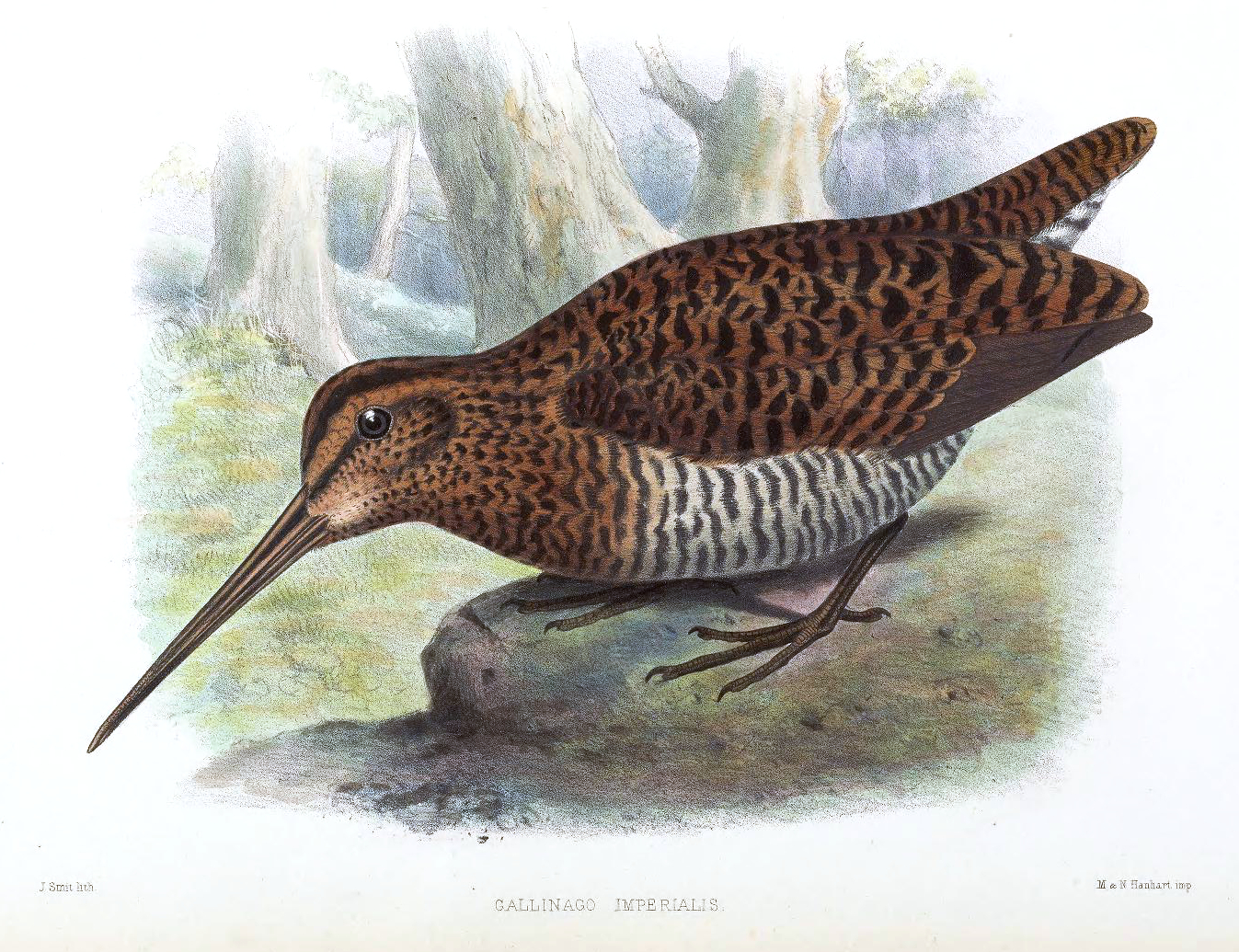

Conservation status
- Near Threatened (IUCN 3.1)

Scientific classification
- Kingdom: Animalia
- Phylum: Chordata
- Class: Aves
- Order: Charadriiformes
- Family: Scolopacidae
- Genus: Gallinago
- Species: G. imperialis

Binomial name
- Gallinago imperialis Sclater, PL & Salvin, 1869

Audio

= Imperial snipe =

Species of bird

The imperial snipe (Gallinago imperialis) is a small stocky wader which breeds in the Andes. For a century it was known only from two specimens collected near Bogotá, Colombia, and was presumed extinct, but it was rediscovered in Peru in 1967 and Ecuador in 1988. It is not known if it is migratory.

== Description ==
This 29–31 cm (11–12 in) long snipe has a stocky body and relatively short legs for a wader. Its adult plumage is dark rufous brown except for the lower belly and undertail, which are white with heavy brown barring. The grey bill is long, straight and fairly robust, and the legs and feet are grey. The sexes are similar. The juvenile plumage is unknown, but in most snipe species, young birds differ from adults only in showing pale fringes on the wing coverts.

In flight, the imperial snipe looks heavy, broad-winged and short-tailed, and the banded belly contrasts with the dark breast and underwing. It has a shatteringly loud raucous song in its display flight, starting with single notes and moving on to double or triple notes.

Compared with other snipes with an overlapping range, the imperial snipe is obviously larger than the Magellan snipe, which has clear pale stripes on its back and lacks barring on the lower belly. The race which occurs in the Andes, Gallinago paraguaiae andina also has yellow legs.

The Andean snipe, Gallinago jamesoni, is similar in build to the imperial snipe, but is paler on the throat and underwings, and has a less contrasted lower belly.

== Behaviour ==
The imperial snipe occurs around the tree-line at 2,745–3,700 m (9,006–12,139 ft) altitude in mosaic habitats consisting of a mixture of bogs, mossy areas, moist elfin forest, tree-ferns and tall grass. Little is known about its habits, and it is mostly observed when displaying.

The dawn and dusk aerial display involves flying high in circles performing the extremely loud song. This is followed by a dive during which the bird makes a drumming sound caused by the vibrations of its modified outer tail feathers.

The imperial snipe's diet is unknown, but other snipe species forage for insects and worms by probing with their long bills.

== Status ==
Having been considered extinct for over half a century, the imperial snipe has now been found at least six sites in Peru and twelve in Ecuador. Although it appears widespread on both east and west slopes in Ecuador and the east slope in Peru, it apparently occurs at very low densities (4-5 displaying within 1.6 km^{2} (0.62 sq mi) of suitable ridge-top habitat) and known populations are small and localised.

This snipe's habitat has been adversely affected by burning, grazing and conversion of páramo to agriculture.

However, if the number of records and known sites continue to increase, the status of this species may be reclassified to Least Concern.
