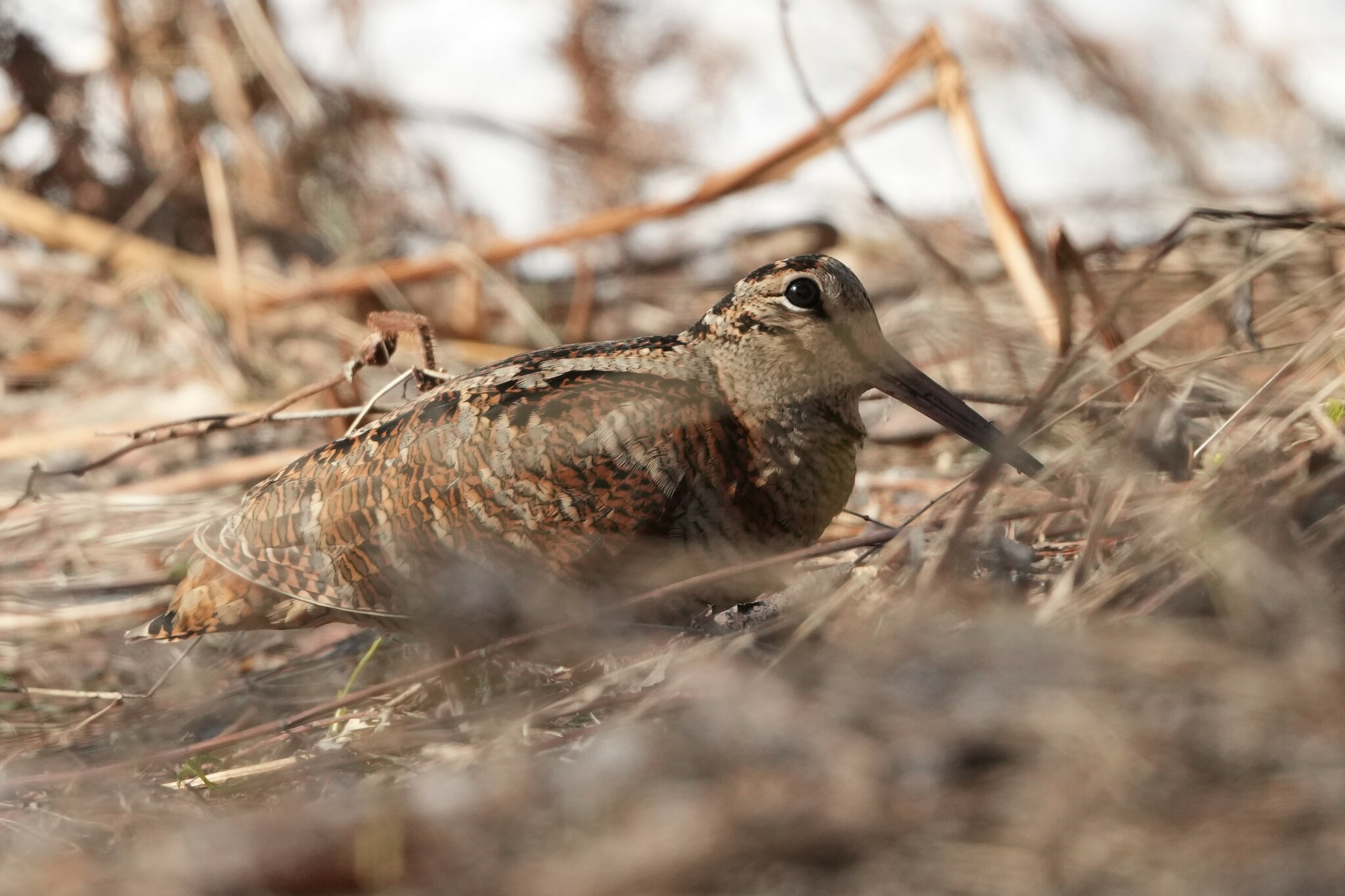
- Eurasian woodcock (Scolopax rusticola)

Scientific classification
- Kingdom: Animalia
- Phylum: Chordata
- Class: Aves
- Order: Charadriiformes
- Suborder: Scolopaci
- Family: Scolopacidae; Rafinesque, 1815

Type genus
- Scolopax

Genera
- Bartramia; Numenius; Limosa; Arenaria; Prosobonia; Calidris; Limnodromus; Scolopax; Coenocorypha; Lymnocryptes; Gallinago; Xenus; Phalaropus; Actitis; Tringa

= Sandpiper =

Sandpipers Temporal range: Early Oligocene to recent

Family of birds

Scolopacidae is a large family of shorebirds, or waders, which mainly includes many species known as sandpipers, but also others such as woodcocks, curlews, and snipes. Most of these species eat small invertebrates picked out of the mud or soil. There is no evidence that different lengths of bills enable multiple species to feed in the same habitat, particularly on the coast, without direct competition for food. On sandy beaches, species with different bill lengths feed on the only abundant invertebrate, such as mole crabs Emerita.

Sandpipers have long bodies and legs, and narrow wings. Most species have a narrow bill, but the form and length are variable. They are small to medium-sized birds, measuring 12 to 66 cm (4.7–26.0 in) in length. The bills are sensitive, allowing the birds to feel the mud and sand as they probe for food. They generally have dull plumage, with cryptic brown, grey, or streaked patterns, although some display brighter colours during the breeding season.

Most species nest in open areas and defend their territories with aerial displays. The nest itself is a simple scrape in the ground, in which the bird typically lays three or four eggs. The young of most species are precocial.

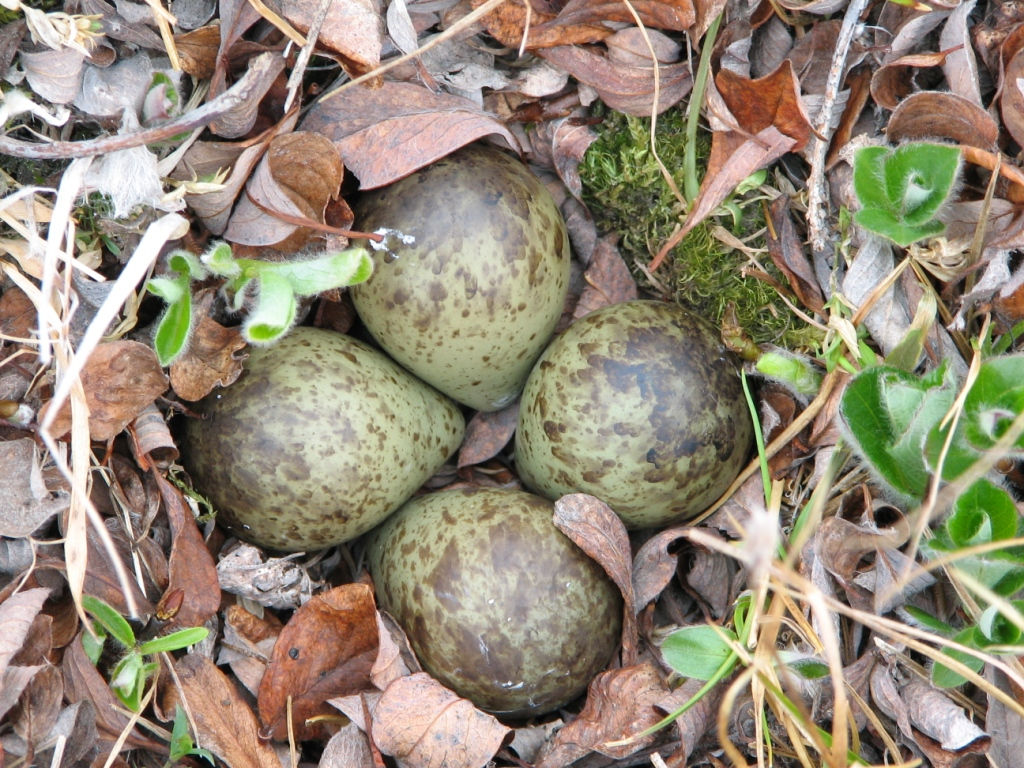
White-rumped sandpiper nest with four eggs

== Taxonomy ==
The family Scolopacidae was introduced (as Scolopacea) by the French polymath Constantine Samuel Rafinesque in 1815. The family contains 98 extant or recently extinct species divided into 15 genera. For more details, see the article List of sandpiper species.

The following genus-level cladogram of the Scolopacidae is based on a study by David Černý and Rossy Natale that was published in 2022.

- Scolopacidae
  - - Bartramia – upland sandpiper
    - Numenius – curlews (9 species)
  - - Limosa – godwits (4 species)
    - - - Limnodromus – dowitchers (3 species)
        - - - Lymnocryptes – jack snipe
            - Scolopax – woodcocks (8 species)
          - - - Gallinago imperialis – imperial snipe
              - - Gallinago undulata – giant snipe
                - Coenocorypha – austral snipes (3 extant and 6 extinct species)
            - Gallinago – snipes (18 species)
      - - - - Xenus – Terek sandpiper
            - Actitis – sandpipers (2 species)
          - - Phalaropus – phalaropes (3 species)
            - Tringa – sandpipers, shanks, tattlers etc (13 species)
        - - Prosobonia – Polynesian sandpipers (1 extant and 3 extinct species)
          - Arenaria – turnstones (2 species)
          - Calidris – sandpipers (24 species)

Image	Genus	Living and recently extinct species
	Bartramia F. Boie, 1826	Upland sandpiper, Bartramia longicauda
	Numenius Brisson, 1760	Bristle-thighed curlew, Numenius tahitiensis; Eurasian whimbrel, Numenius phaeopus; Hudsonian whimbrel, Numenius hudsonicus; Little curlew, Numenius minutus; †? Eskimo curlew, Numenius borealis (last seen in 1987); Long-billed curlew, Numenius americanus; Far Eastern curlew, Numenius madagascariensis; † Slender-billed curlew, Numenius tenuirostris (last seen in 1995); Eurasian curlew, Numenius arquata
	Limosa Brisson, 1760	Bar-tailed godwit, Limosa lapponica; Black-tailed godwit, Limosa limosa; Hudsonian godwit, Limosa haemastica; Marbled godwit, Limosa fedoa
	Limnodromus Wied-Neuwied, 1833	Asian dowitcher, Limnodromus semipalmatus; Long-billed dowitcher, Limnodromus scolopaceus; Short-billed dowitcher, Limnodromus griseus
	Lymnocryptes F. Boie, 1826	Jack snipe, Lymnocryptes minimus
	Scolopax Linnaeus, 1758	American woodcock, Scolopax minor (large North American range); Eurasian woodcock, Scolopax rusticola (large Eurasian range); Amami woodcock, Scolopax mira (endemic to the Amami Islands in Japan); Bukidnon woodcock, Scolopax bukidnonensis (endemic to Luzon and Mindanao in the Philippines); Javan woodcock, Scolopax saturata (endemic to Sumatra and Java in Indonesia); New Guinea woodcock, Scolopax rosenbergii (endemic to New Guinea); Sulawesi woodcock, Scolopax celebensis (endemic to Sulawesi in Indonesia); Moluccan woodcock, Scolopax rochussenii (endemic to the Maluku Islands in Indonesia)
	Coenocorypha G. R. Gray, 1855	† North Island snipe, Coenocorypha barrierensis Oliver, 1955 – also known as the Little Barrier Snipe; † South Island snipe, Coenocorypha iredalei Rothschild, 1921 – also known as the Stewart Island Snipe; Chatham snipe, Coenocorypha pusilla (Buller, 1869) – Chatham Islands; Snares snipe, Coenocorypha huegeli (Tristram, 1893) – Snares Islands; Subantarctic snipe, Coenocorypha aucklandica (G. R. Gray, 1845); Auckland snipe, C. a. aucklandica (G. R. Gray, 1845) – Auckland Islands; Antipodes snipe, C. a. meinertzhagenae Rothschild, 1927 – Antipodes Islands; Campbell snipe, C. a. perseverance Miskelly & Baker, 2010 – Campbell Island; † Forbes's snipe, Coenocorypha chathamica (Forbes, 1893) – Chatham Islands; † Viti Levu snipe, Coenocorypha miratropica Worthy, 2003 – Fiji; † New Caledonian snipe, Coenocorypha neocaledonica Worthy et al., 2013 – New Caledonia; † Norfolk snipe, Coenocorypha sp. – Norfolk Island
	Gallinago Brisson, 1760	Imperial snipe, Gallinago imperialis; Jameson's snipe, Gallinago jamesoni; Fuegian snipe, Gallinago stricklandii; Solitary snipe, Gallinago solitaria; Wood snipe, Gallinago nemoricola; Great snipe, Gallinago media; Swinhoe's snipe, Gallinago megala; Pin-tailed snipe, Gallinago stenura; Latham's snipe, Gallinago hardwickii; African snipe, Gallinago nigripennis; Common snipe, Gallinago gallinago; Wilson's snipe, Gallinago delicata; Giant snipe, Gallinago undulata; Noble snipe, Gallinago nobilis; Puna snipe, Gallinago andina; Madagascar snipe, Gallinago macrodactyla; Pantanal snipe, Gallinago paraguaiae; Magellanic snipe, Gallinago magellanica
	Phalaropus Brisson, 1760	Wilson's phalarope, Phalaropus tricolor; Red phalarope, Phalaropus fulicarius; Red-necked phalarope, Phalaropus lobatus
	Xenus Kaup, 1829	Terek sandpiper, Xenus cinereus
	Actitis Illiger, 1811	Common sandpiper, Actitis hypoleucos (of Eurasia); Spotted sandpiper, Actitis macularius (of North America)
	Tringa Linnaeus, 1758	Green sandpiper, Tringa ochropus; Solitary sandpiper, Tringa solitaria; Grey-tailed tattler, Tringa brevipes (formerly Heteroscelus brevipes); Wandering tattler, Tringa incana (formerly Heteroscelus incanus); Marsh sandpiper, Tringa stagnatilis; Wood sandpiper, Tringa glareola; Common redshank, Tringa totanus; Lesser yellowlegs, Tringa flavipes; Nordmann's greenshank, Tringa guttifer; Willet, Tringa semipalmata (formerly Catoptrophorus semipalmatus); Spotted redshank, Tringa erythropus; Common greenshank, Tringa nebularia; Greater yellowlegs, Tringa melanoleuca
	Prosobonia Bonaparte, 1850	† Kiritimati sandpiper, Prosobonia cancellata; † Tahiti sandpiper, Prosobonia leucoptera; † Moorea sandpiper, Prosobonia ellisi; Tuamotu sandpiper, Prosobonia parvirostris
	Arenaria Brisson, 1760	Ruddy turnstone, Arenaria interpres; Black turnstone, Arenaria melanocephala
	Calidris Merrem, 1804	Great knot, Calidris tenuirostris; Red knot, Calidris canutus; Surfbird, Calidris virgata; Ruff, Calidris pugnax; Broad-billed sandpiper, Calidris falcinellus; Sharp-tailed sandpiper, Calidris acuminata; Stilt sandpiper, Calidris himantopus; Curlew sandpiper, Calidris ferruginea; Temminck's stint, Calidris temminckii; Long-toed stint, Calidris subminuta; Red-necked stint, Calidris ruficollis; Spoon-billed sandpiper, Calidris pygmaea; Buff-breasted sandpiper, Calidris subruficollis; Sanderling, Calidris alba; Dunlin, Calidris alpina; Purple sandpiper, Calidris maritima; Rock sandpiper, Calidris ptilocnemis; Baird's sandpiper, Calidris bairdii; Little stint, Calidris minuta; Least sandpiper, Calidris minutilla; White-rumped sandpiper, Calidris fuscicollis; Pectoral sandpiper, Calidris melanotos; Western sandpiper, Calidris mauri; Semipalmated sandpiper, Calidris pusilla

Calidris alba in Kanagawa, Japan

== Fossil record ==
The early fossil record of Scolopacidae is relatively fragmentary, with several Paleogene specimens of uncertain taxonomic placement. Among the oldest reported members is the extinct Paractitis bardi, known from a partial coracoid recovered from the Cypress Hills Formation of Saskatchewan, Canada. Originally considered Early Oligocene in age, the fossil has subsequently been assigned to the Late Eocene. Its placement within Scolopacidae remains uncertain, particularly because the preserved coracoid lacks the supracoracoideus nerve foramen characteristic of Scolopaci. An almost complete postcranial skeleton from the Early Oligocene of the Luberon region in southern France has also been referred to Scolopacidae, although its precise relationships within the family remain unresolved.

More extensive remains are known from the Early Miocene lacustrine deposits of Saint-Gérand-le-Puy, Allier, in central France. The assemblage includes the extinct scolopacids Elorius paludicola and Parvelorius gracilis, the latter originally assigned to the living genus Tringa. Two additional species, Elorius limosoides and Parvelorius calidris, are tentatively referred to these extinct genera. Their remains include elements of the skull, humerus, coracoid and tarsometatarsus, with anatomical features distinguishing them from living scolopacids. The same deposits have yielded Scolopacimilis lartetianus, originally described as Totanus lartetianus, and Becassius charadriioides. Both exhibit a combination of skeletal characteristics differing from those of extant Scolopacidae, and their inclusion within the family remains uncertain.

The Middle Miocene deposits of the Nördlinger Ries basin in Bavaria, Germany, have yielded the extinct genus Mirolia, represented by M. brevirostrata, M. dubia, M. parvula and the tentatively assigned M. mascalidris. The fossils comprise cranial and postcranial elements, including the mandible, humerus, coracoid and tarsometatarsus. Their morphology indicates affinities with Calidridinae, particularly in the proportions of the bill and several features of the humerus. Mirolia brevirostrata is among the oldest fossil representatives used to establish the minimum evolutionary age of the calidrid lineage.

Other Miocene scolopacids include Numenius antiquus from Sansan in France, known from fragments of the tarsometatarsus. Its assignment to the living genus Numenius is uncertain because the preserved elements share morphological characteristics with several other scolopacid genera. Additional fossil species historically placed in Totanus, now considered a synonym of Tringa, have been recorded from European deposits, including "Totanus" grivensis, "T." majori and "T." minor from the Middle Miocene of La Grive-Saint-Alban, France. These taxa require further taxonomic revision.

North American Miocene records include Limosa vanrossemi from the Late Miocene of California, represented by a partially crushed postcranial skeleton preserved on a slab. Additional scolopacids have been reported from Late Miocene to Early Pliocene deposits in Arizona, although several specimens cannot be confidently assigned to living genera. The species "Totanus" teruelensis, originally described from the Late Miocene of Los Mansuetos, Teruel, Spain, was also historically included among scolopacids. However, the morphology of its distal humerus, particularly the deep brachial depression, more closely resembles that of Laridae. The species has also been referred to the gull genus Larus as Larus teruelensis, and its original scolopacid assignment is considered doubtful.

Several indeterminate fossil remains have also been assigned to Scolopacidae:

- Scolopacidae gen. et sp. indet. (Middle Miocene of Františkovy Lázně, Czech Republic) – represented by the proximal end of a left humerus and the distal end of a right ulna. Additional material attributed to the same unidentified form has been reported from the Late Miocene of Kohfidisch, Austria.
- Scolopacidae gen. et sp. indet. (Pliocene of Sherman County, Kansas, United States) – known from the distal end of a right tarsometatarsus, comparable in size and morphology to that of a pectoral sandpiper. Its affinities may lie within Calidridinae, although a more basal position cannot be excluded.

The Pleistocene record includes fossils belonging to several living genera. Remains of Gallinago hardwickii and multiple species of Calidris have been recovered from Blanche Cave in the Naracoorte Caves of South Australia, dating from approximately 60,000 to 14,000 years ago. The assemblage includes Calidris acuminata, specimens tentatively assigned to C. ferruginea, and remains comparable in size to C. canutus. These fossils occur alongside other Charadriiformes and provide evidence of shallow wetlands and associated bird communities during the Late Pleistocene, with a reduction in wetland-associated species towards the end of the Last Glacial Maximum.

== Description ==
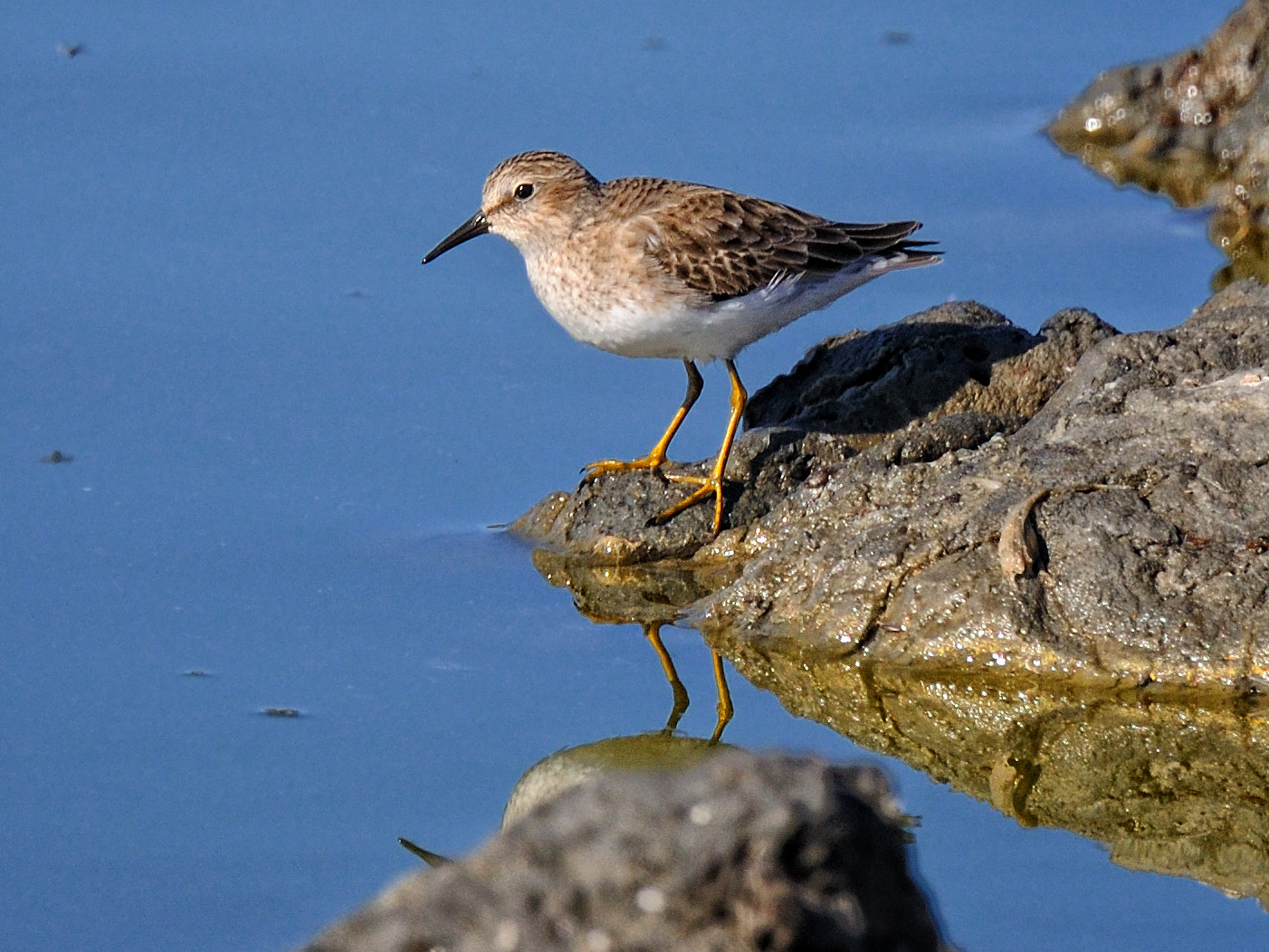
The least sandpiper is the smallest species of sandpiper

The sandpipers exhibit considerable range in size and appearance, the wide range of body forms reflecting a wide range of ecological niches. Sandpipers range in size from the least sandpiper, at as little as 18 grams (0.040 pounds) and 11 cm (4.3 in) in length, to the Far Eastern curlew, at up to 66 cm (26 in) in length, and the Eurasian curlew, at up to 1.3 kg (2.9 lb). Within species there is considerable variation in patterns of sexual dimorphism. Males are larger than females in ruffs and several sandpipers, but are smaller than females in the knots, curlews, phalaropes and godwits. The sexes are similarly sized in the snipes, woodcock and tringine sandpipers. Compared to the other large family of wading birds, the plovers (Charadriidae), they tend to have smaller eyes, more slender heads, and longer thinner bills. Some are quite long-legged, and most species have three forward pointing toes with a smaller hind toe (the exception is the sanderling, which lacks a hind toe).

Sandpipers are more geared towards tactile foraging methods than the plovers, which favour more visual foraging methods, and this is reflected in the high density of tactile receptors in the tips of their bills. These receptors are housed in a slight horny swelling at the tip of the bill (except for the surfbird and the two turnstones). Bill shape is highly variable within the family, reflecting differences in feeding ecology. Bill length relative to head length varies from three times the length of the head in the long-billed curlew to just under half the head length in the Tuamotu sandpiper. Bills may be straight, slightly upcurled or strongly downcurved. Like all birds, the bills of sandpipers are capable of cranial kinesis, literally being able to move the bones of the skull (other than the obvious movement of the lower jaw) and specifically bending the upper jaw without opening the entire jaw, an act known as rhynchokinesis. It has been hypothesized this helps when probing by allowing the bill to be partly opened with less force and improving manipulation of prey items in the substrate. Rhynchokinesis is also used by sandpipers feeding on prey in water to catch and manipulate prey.

== Distribution, habitat, and movements ==
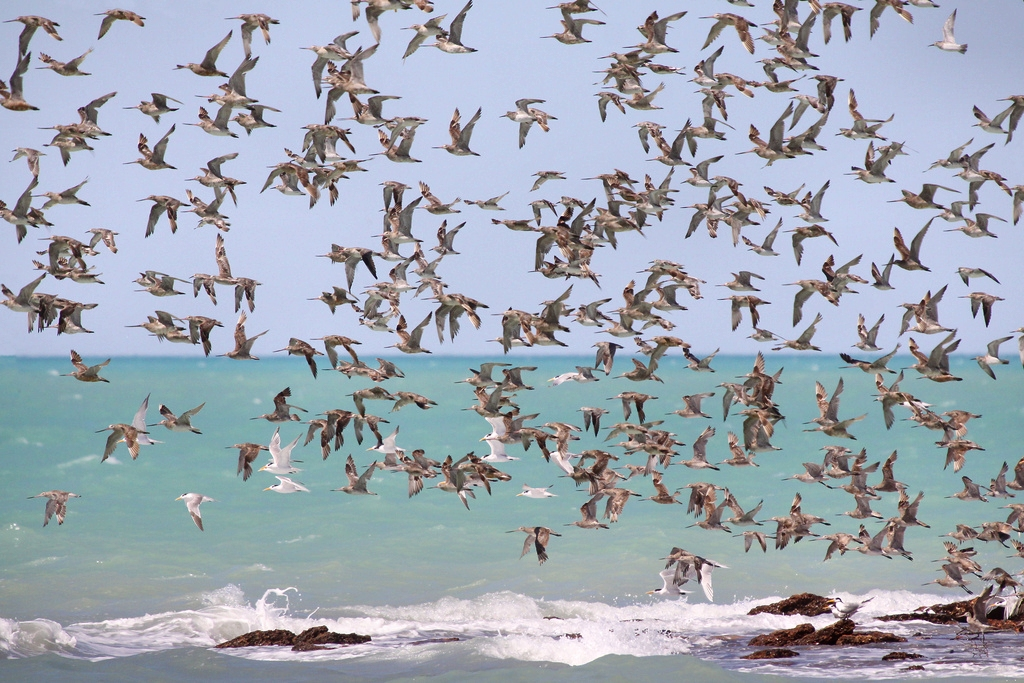
Sandpipers spending the non-breeding season in Roebuck Bay, Western Australia

The sandpipers have a cosmopolitan distribution, occurring across most of the world's land surfaces except for Antarctica and the driest deserts. A majority of the family breed at moderate to high latitudes in the Northern Hemisphere, in fact accounting for the most northerly breeding birds in the world. Only a few species breed in tropical regions, ten of which are snipes and woodcocks and the remaining species being the unusual Tuamotu sandpiper, which breeds in French Polynesia (although prior to the arrival of humans in the Pacific there were several other closely related species of Polynesian sandpiper).

== Diet and feeding ==
There are broadly four feeding styles employed by the sandpipers, although many species are flexible and may use more than one style. The first is pecking with occasional probing, usually done by species in drier habitats that do not have soft soils or mud. The second, and most frequent, method employed is probing soft soils, muds and sands for prey. The third, used by Tringa shanks, involves running in shallow water with the bill under the water chasing fish, a method that uses sight as well as tactile senses. The final method, employed by the phalaropes and some Calidris sandpipers, involves pecking at the water for small prey. A few species of scolopacids are omnivorous to some extent, taking seeds and shoots as well as invertebrates.

== Breeding ==
Many sandpipers form monogamous pairs, but some sandpipers have female-only parental care, some male-only parental care, some sequential polyandry and other compete for the mate on the lek. Sandpipers lay three or four eggs into the nest, which is usually a vague depression or scrape in the open ground, scarcely lined with soft vegetation. In species where both parents incubate the eggs, females and males share their incubation duties in various ways both within and between species. In some pairs, parents exchange on the nest in the morning and in the evening so that their incubation rhythm follows a 24-hour day, in others each sex may sit on the nest continuously for up to 24 hours before it is exchanged by its partner. In species where only a single parent incubates the eggs, during the night the parent sits on the eggs nearly continuously and then during the warmest part of a day leaves the nest for short feeding bouts. Chicks hatch after about three weeks of incubation and are able to walk and forage within a few hours of hatching. A single parent or both parents guide and brood the chicks.

== Gallery ==
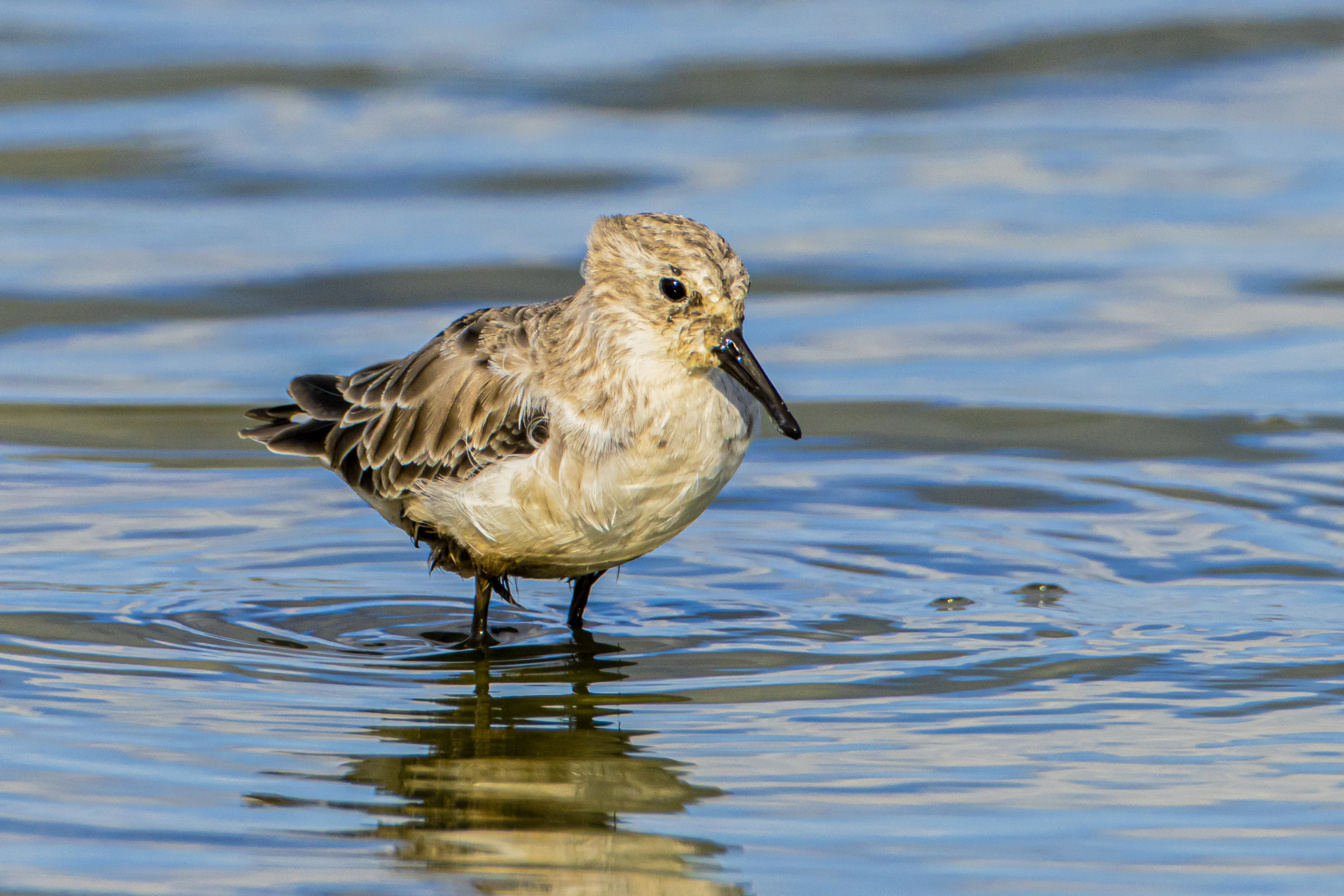
Little stint, Tunisia

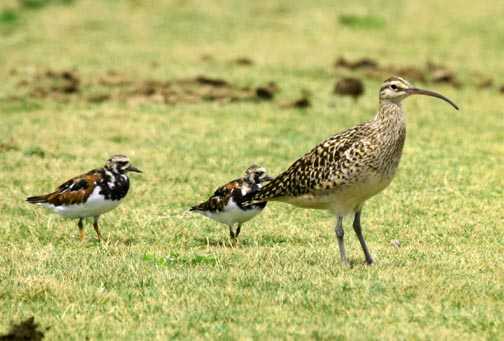
Bristle-thighed curlew (Numenius tahitiensis, right) and ruddy turnstones (Arenaria interpres)

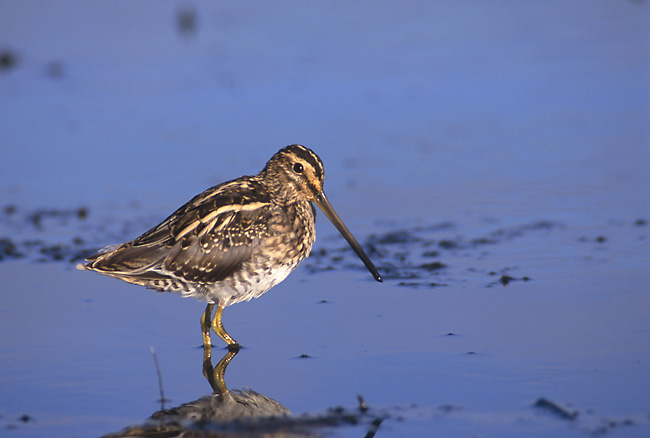
Common snipe (Gallinago gallinago)

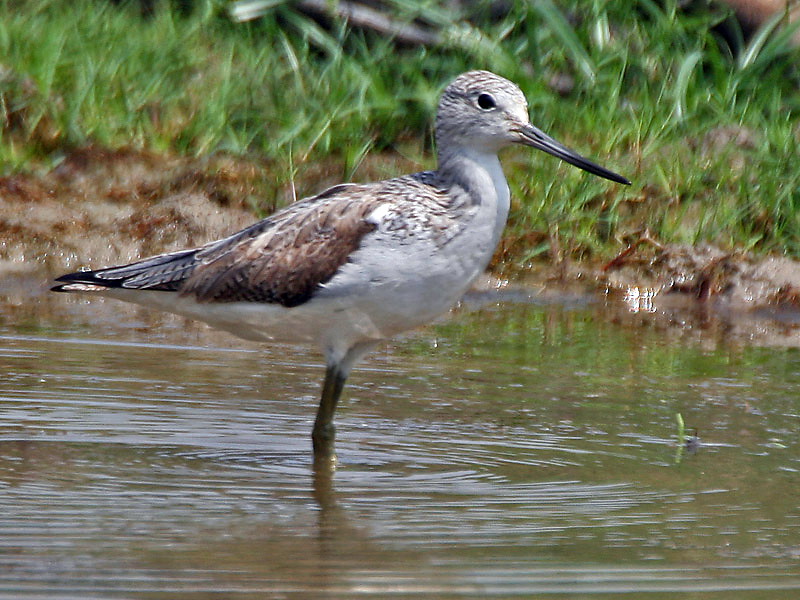
Greenshank (Tringa nebularia)

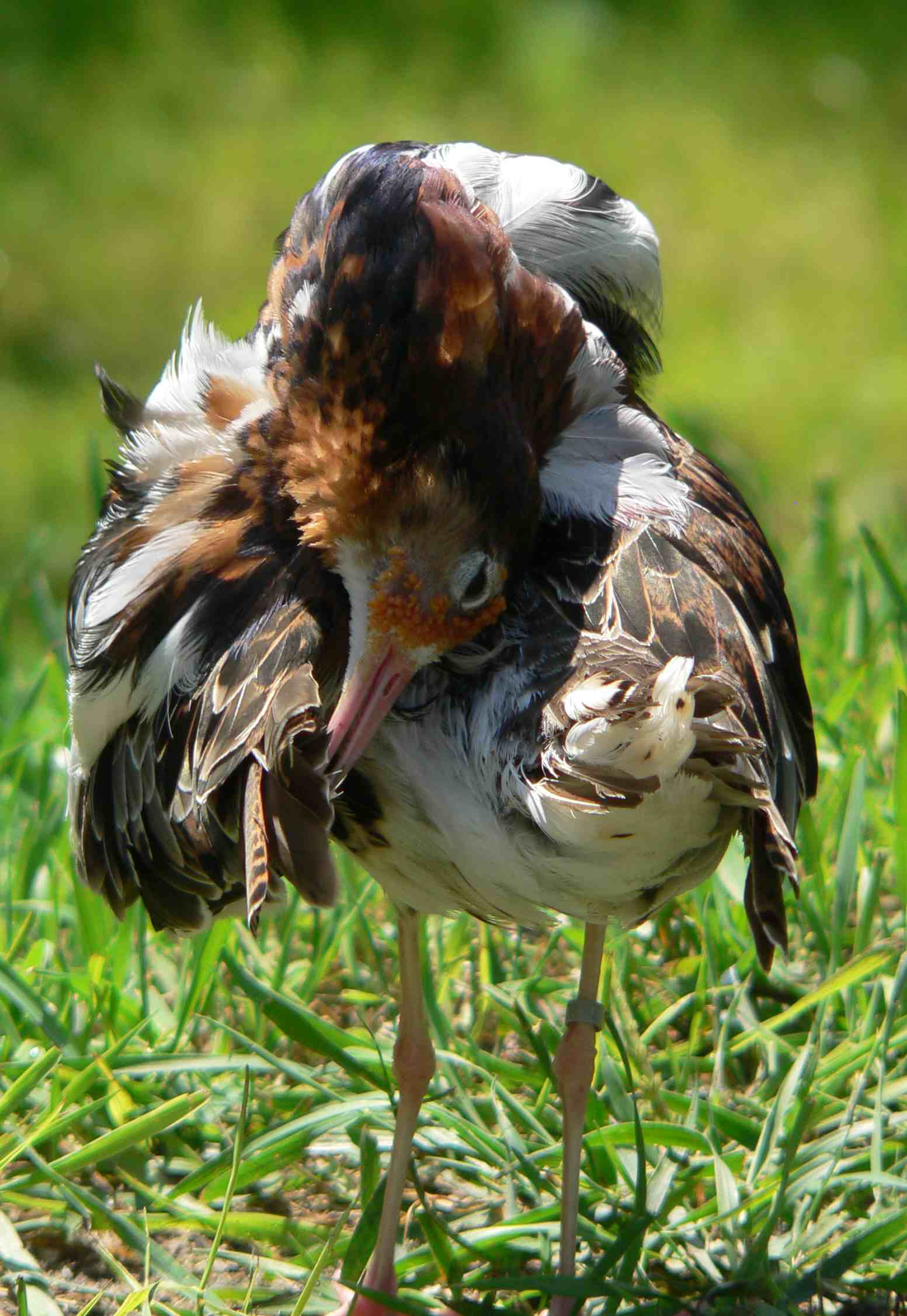
Preening male ruff (Calidris pugnax)
