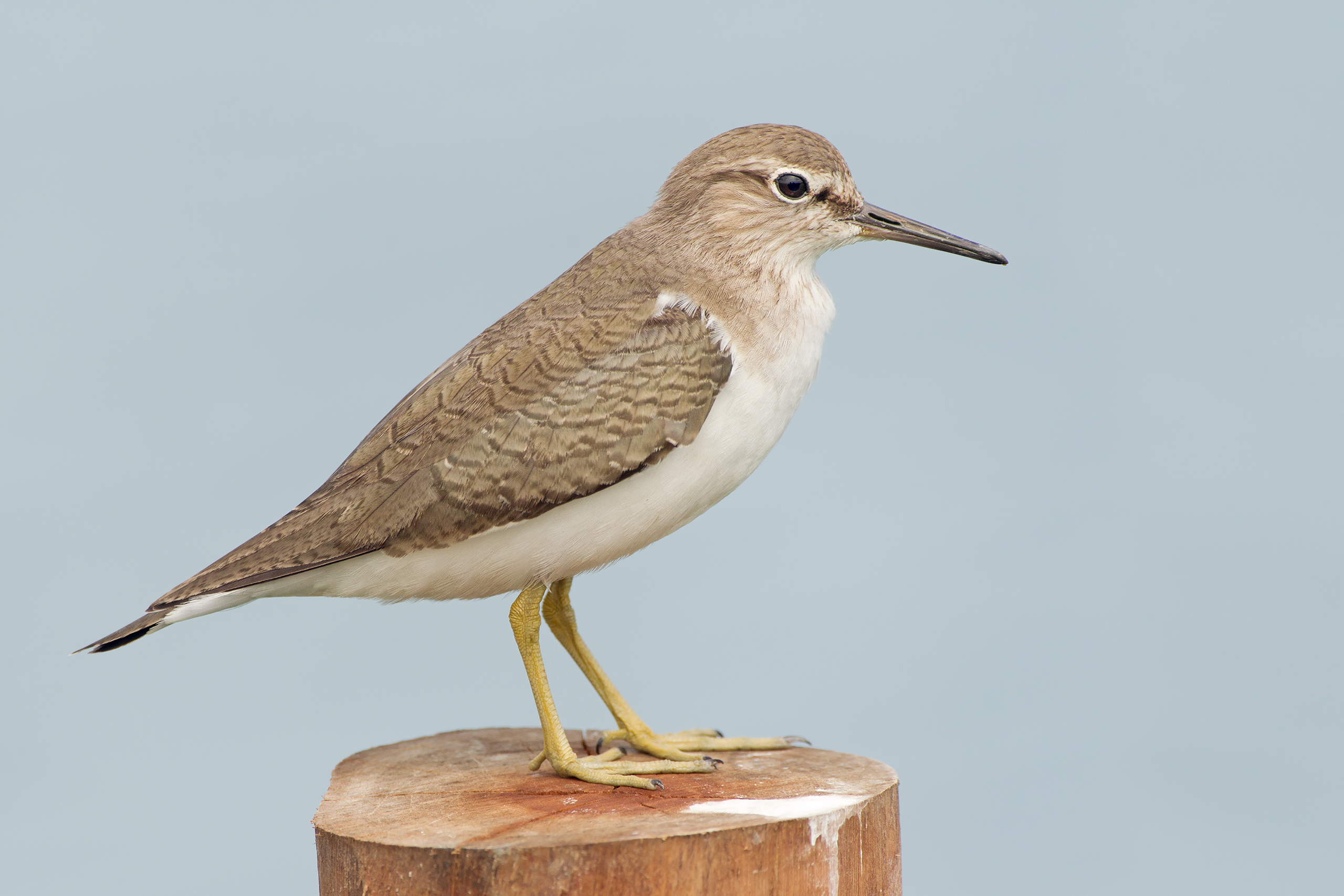
- Adult, Laem Pak Bia, Thailand Bird recorded in Scotland

Conservation status
- Least Concern (IUCN 3.1)

Scientific classification
- Kingdom: Animalia
- Phylum: Chordata
- Class: Aves
- Order: Charadriiformes
- Family: Scolopacidae
- Genus: Actitis
- Species: A. hypoleucos

Binomial name
- Actitis hypoleucos (Linnaeus, 1758)
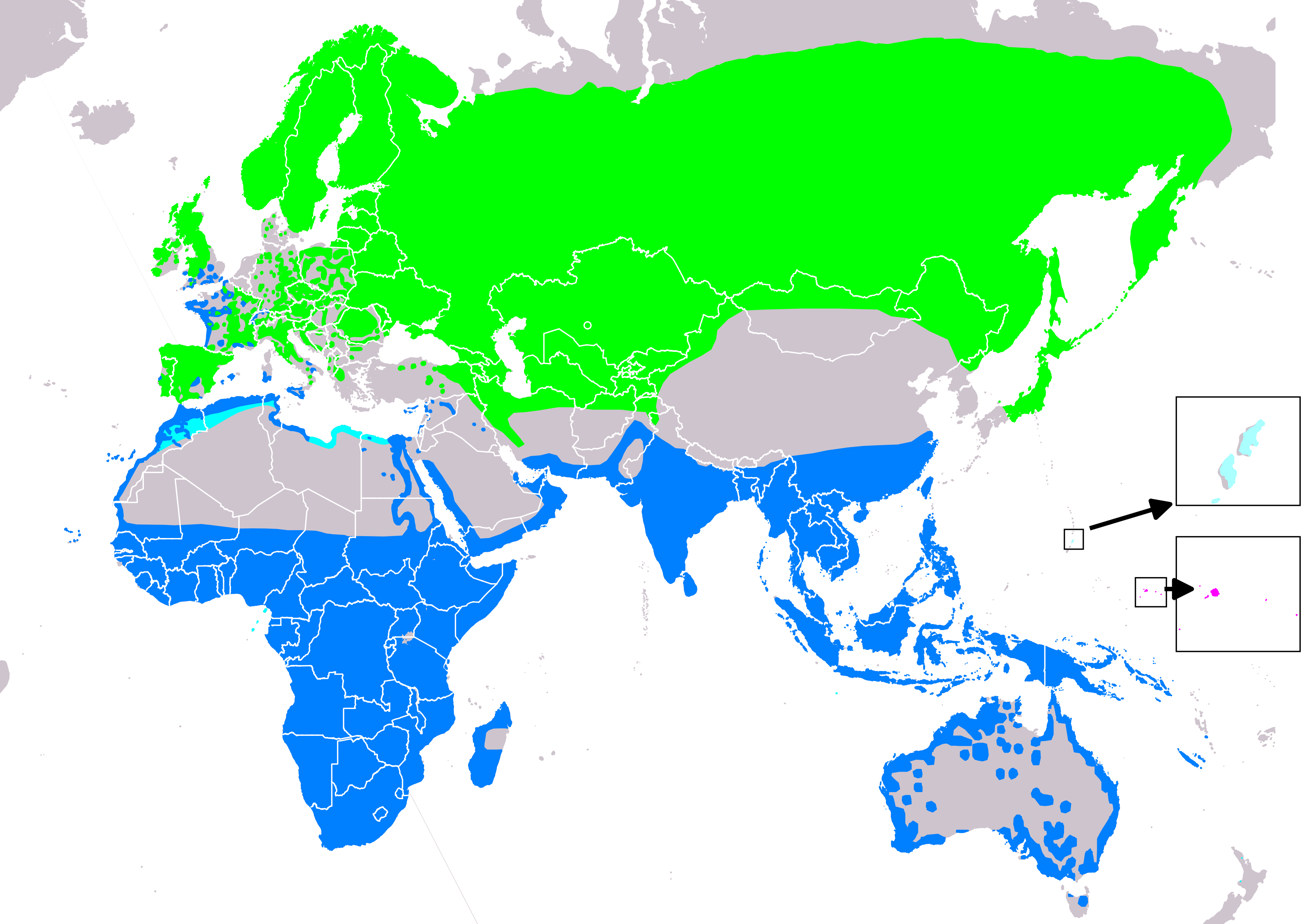
- Range Breeding Non-breeding Passage Possibly extant (non-breeding) Possibly extant (passage)

Synonyms
- Tringa hypoleucos Linnaeus, 1758

= Common sandpiper =

Species of bird

Actitis hypoleucos

The common sandpiper (Actitis hypoleucos) is a small Palearctic wader. This bird and its American sister species, the spotted sandpiper (A. macularia), make up the genus Actitis. They are parapatric and replace each other geographically; stray birds of either species may settle down with breeders of the other and hybridize. Hybridization has also been reported between the common sandpiper and the green sandpiper, a member of the closely related genus Tringa.

== Taxonomy ==
The common sandpiper was formally described by the Swedish naturalist Carl Linnaeus in 1758 in the tenth edition of his Systema Naturae under the binomial name Tringa hypoleucos. The species is now placed together with the spotted sandpiper in the genus Actitis that was introduced in 1811 by the German zoologist Johann Karl Wilhelm Illiger. The genus name Actitis is from Ancient Greek aktites meaning "coast-dweller" from akte meaning "coast". The specific epithet hypoleucos combines the Ancient Greek hupo meaning "beneath" with leukos meaning "white". The species is monotypic and no subspecies are recognised.

== Description ==
The adult is 18–20 cm (7.1–7.9 in) long with a 32–35 cm (13–14 in) wingspan. It has greyish-brown upperparts, white underparts, short dark-yellowish legs and feet, and a bill with a pale base and dark tip. In winter plumage, they are duller and have more conspicuous barring on the wings, though this is still only visible at close range. Juveniles are more heavily barred above and have buff edges to the wing feathers.

This species is very similar to the slightly larger spotted sandpiper (A. macularia) in non-breeding plumage. But its darker legs and feet and the crisper wing pattern (visible in flight) tend to give it away, and of course they are only rarely found in the same location.

== Distribution and migration ==
The common sandpiper breeds across most of temperate and subtropical Europe and Asia, and migrates to Africa, southern Asia and Australia in winter. The eastern edge of its migration route passes by Palau in Micronesia, where hundreds of birds may gather for a stop-over. They depart the Palau region for their breeding quarters around the last week of April to the first week of May.

== Behaviour and ecology ==
The Common Sandpiper is usually encountered alone, occasionally in small groups, although larger flocks are sometimes formed around migration or at breeding season roosts. It seldom joins multispecies flocks. This species has a distinctive stiff-winged flight, low over the water.

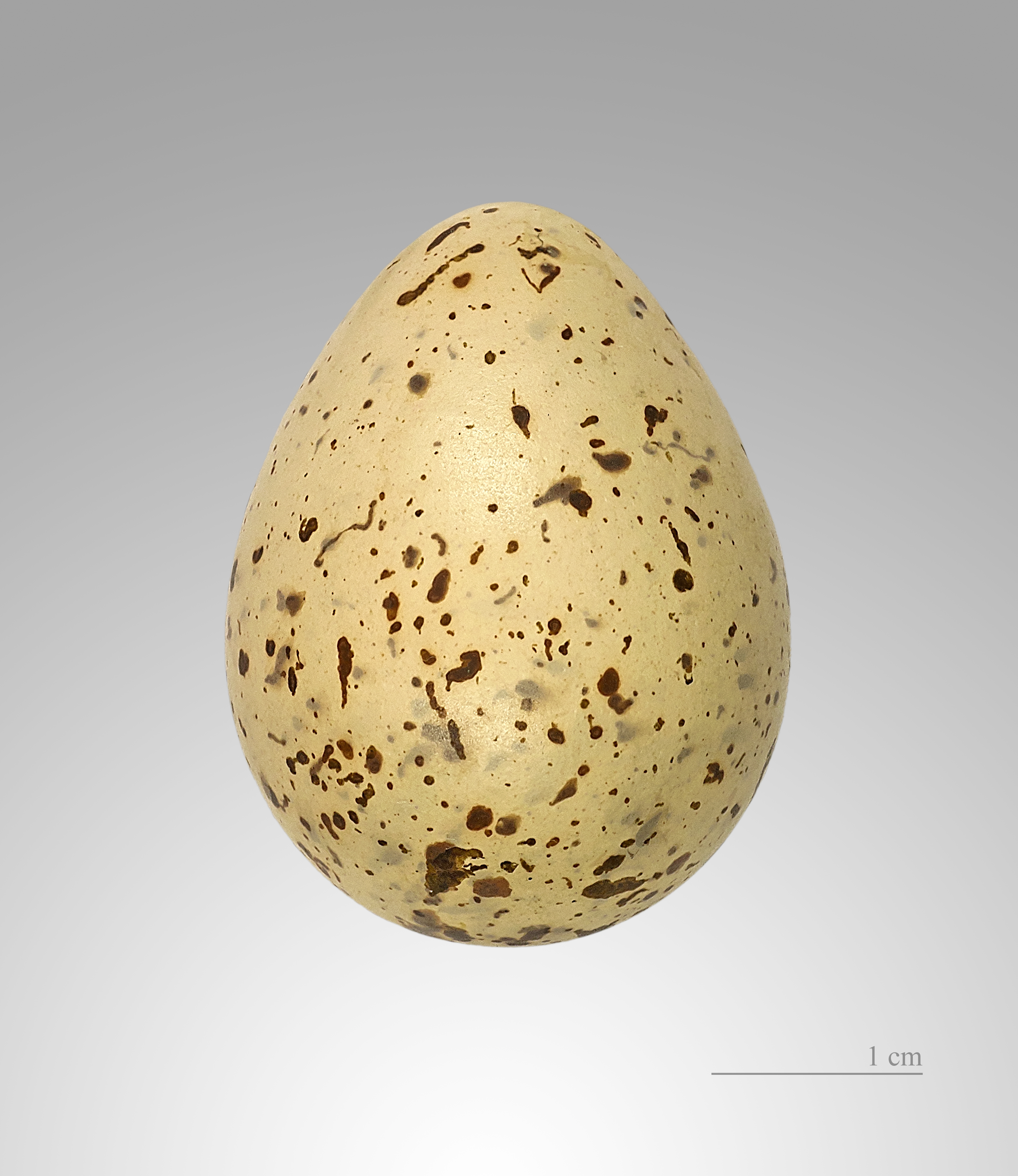
Egg

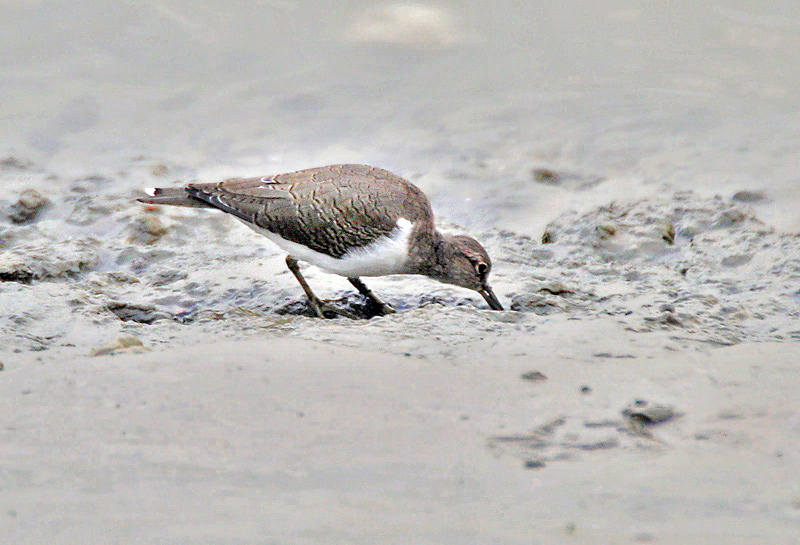
Wintering bird foraging matakakoni-style in Puri

=== Breeding ===
It nests on the ground near freshwater. When threatened, the young may cling to their parent's body to be flown away to safety.

=== Feeding ===
The common sandpiper forages by sight on the ground or in shallow water, picking up small food items such as insects, crustaceans and other invertebrates; it may even catch insects in flight.

== Conservation ==
It is widespread and common, and therefore classified as a species of least concern on the IUCN Red List but is a vulnerable species in some states of Australia. The common sandpiper is one of the species to which the Agreement on the Conservation of African-Eurasian Migratory Waterbirds (AEWA) applies.

== Relationship to humans ==
In the Nukumanu language of the Nukumanu Islands (Papua New Guinea), this species is usually called tiritavoi. Another Nukumanu name for it, matakakoni, exists, but this is considered somewhat taboo and not used when children and women are around. The reason for this is that matakakoni means "bird that walks a little, then copulates", in reference to the pumping tail and thrusting head movements the Actitis species characteristically perform during foraging.
