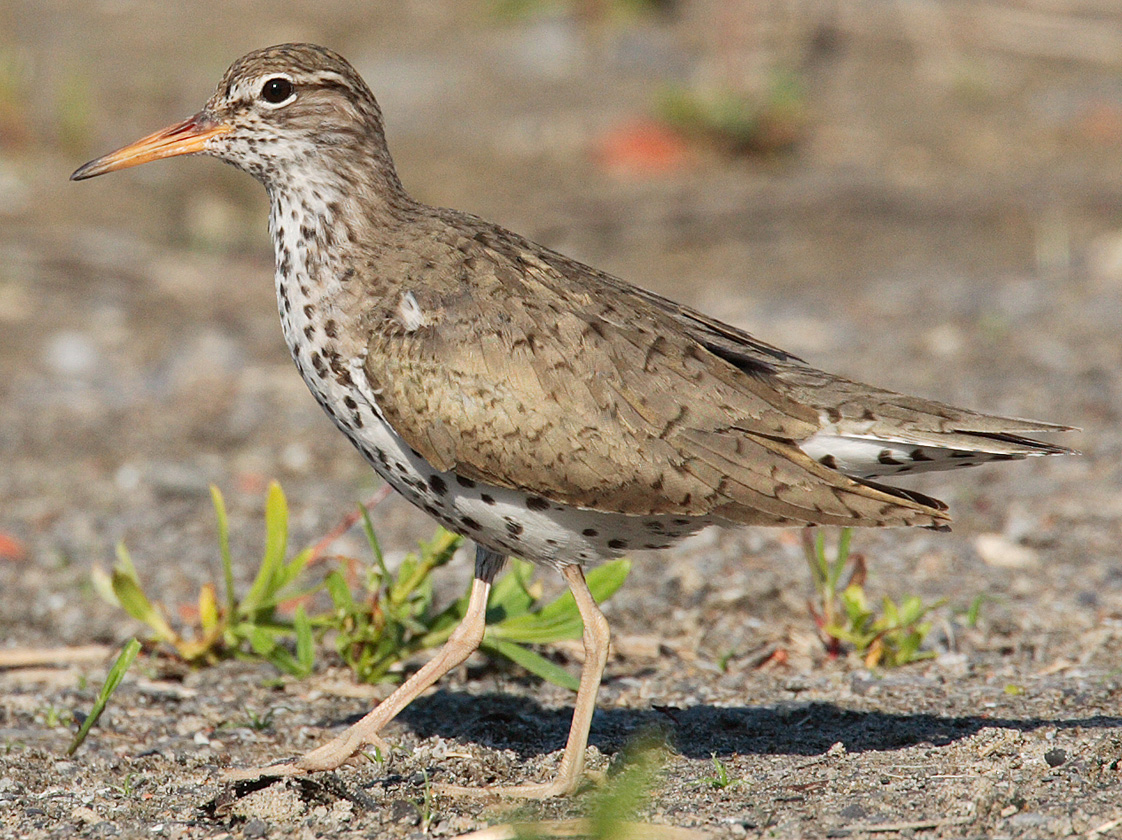
- Breeding plumage

Conservation status
- Least Concern (IUCN 3.1)

Scientific classification
- Kingdom: Animalia
- Phylum: Chordata
- Class: Aves
- Order: Charadriiformes
- Family: Scolopacidae
- Genus: Actitis
- Species: A. macularius

Binomial name
- Actitis macularius (Linnaeus, 1766)
- Range Breeding Migration Non-breeding

Synonyms
- Tringa macularia Linnaeus, 1766; Actitis macularia orth. err. Tringoides macularius Sharpe, 1896

Audio
- Call

= Spotted sandpiper =

Species of bird

The spotted sandpiper (Actitis macularius) is a small shorebird. Together with its sister species the common sandpiper (A. hypoleucos), it makes up the genus Actitis. They replace each other geographically; stray birds may settle down with breeders of the other species and hybridize.

== Taxonomy ==
The spotted sandpiper was formally described by the Swedish naturalist Carl Linnaeus in 1766 in the twelfth edition of his Systema Naturae under the binomial name Tringa macularia. The type locality is Pennsylvania. The species is now placed together with common sandpiper in the genus Actitis and was introduced in 1811 by the German zoologist Johann Illiger. The genus name Actitis is from the Ancient Greek aktites meaning "coast-dweller" from akte meaning "coast". The specific epithet macularius is Latin meaning "spotted". The species is monotypic: no subspecies are recognised.

== Description ==
Adults have short yellowish legs and an orange bill with a dark tip. The body is brown on top and white underneath with black spots. These spots vary in degree over the course of spotted sandpipers' lives, becoming especially prevalent around the breeding season. The overall health of spotted sandpipers may be suggested by the "spottiness" of an individual. Generally, females with more "spottiness" were healthier than those who did not have as many spots. The condition of males based on the amount of spots they exhibit is yet to be determined. Additionally, spot size gets smaller and the spot shape becomes more irregularly shaped as age increases. Spotted sandpipers also feature a white supercilium.

Non-breeding birds, depicted below, do not have the spotted underparts, and are very similar to the common sandpiper of Eurasia; the main difference is the more washed-out wing pattern visible in flight and the normally light yellow legs and feet of the spotted sandpiper. The Actitis species have a distinctive stiff-winged flight low over the water. They also have a distinctive walk in which their tails bob up and down. Males and females exhibit similar physical measurements, but differ in weight; females tend to be about 20-25% heavier than males.

Measurements:

- Length: 7.1-7.9 in (18–20 cm)
- Weight: 1.2-1.8 oz (34-50 g)
- Wingspan: 14.6-15.8 in (37–40 cm)

== Distribution ==
Spotted sandpipers are a philopatric species. Their breeding habitat is near fresh water across most of Canada and the United States. They migrate to the southern United States, the Caribbean, and South America, and are very rare vagrants to western Europe. These are not gregarious birds and are seldom seen in flocks. Spotted sandpipers are the most widespread species of their kind in North America due to their high breeding rates and their ability to adapt to various environmental pressures.

== Behaviour ==
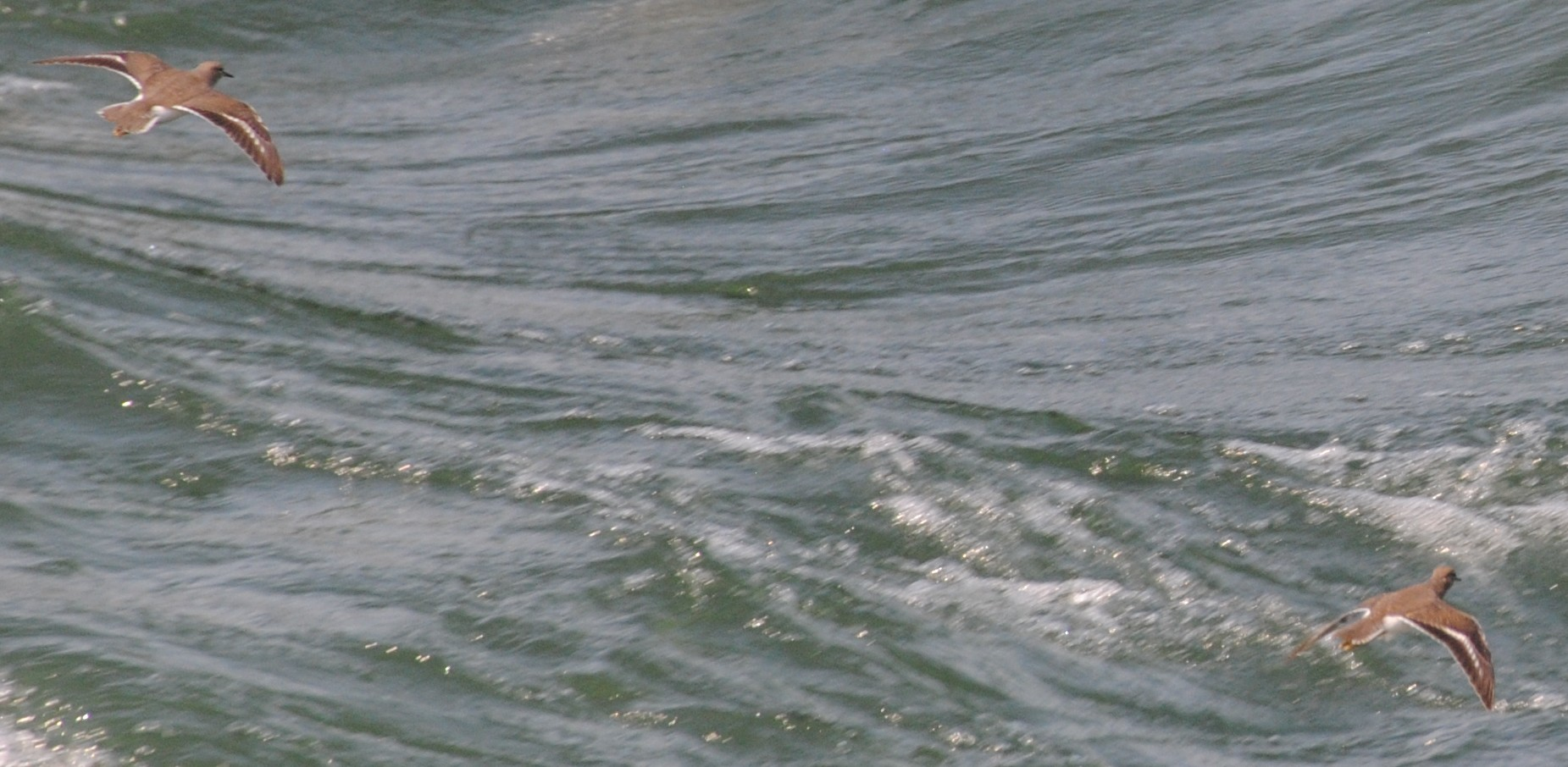
'Record shot' of spotted sandpipers at Île Sainte-Hélène in Montreal, Canada, showing diagnostic features such as the all-brown back and tail (i.e. no black, unlike many other sandpipers), white leading and trailing edge to the wings, partial white wingbar, and white edging to tail.

=== Breeding ===
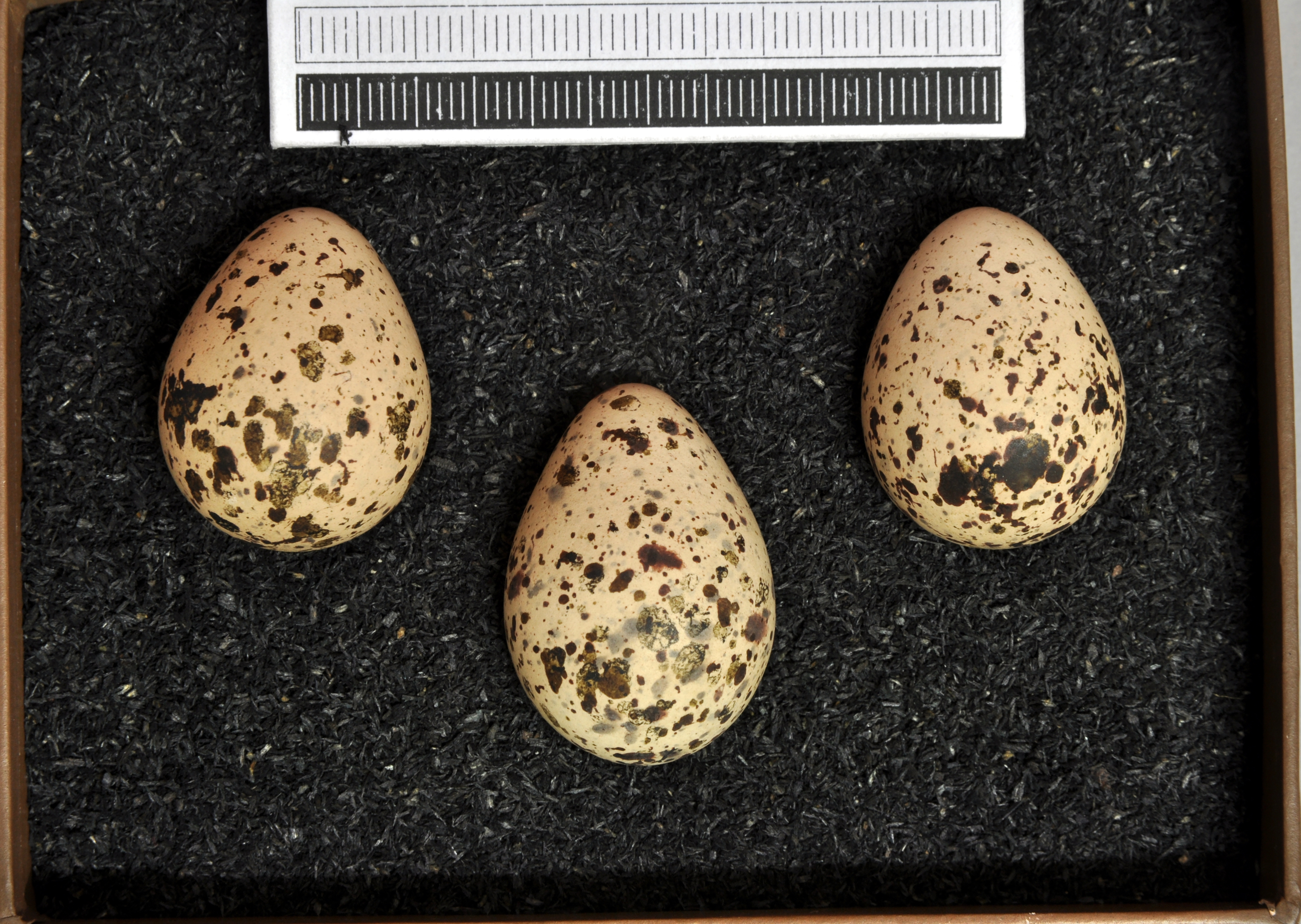
Eggs, Collection Museum Wiesbaden

Breeding grounds are chosen based on various environmental factors but tend to be in the proximity of bodies of water that offer some coverage from vegetation. Successful breeding sites may be used repeatedly until either the site becomes physically unsuitable (from overgrown vegetation or flooding) or predation becomes too severe. The females usually arrive at breeding grounds before the males do and establish their territories. Males arrive at breeding sites later but it is uncertain whether they will arrive at the same breeding sites that some females have chosen. The search for mates amongst female spotted sandpipers is much more competitive than finding potential mates for males.

During each summer breeding season, females may mate with and lay clutches for more than one male, leaving incubation to them. This is called polyandry. Male spotted sandpipers take care of the offspring, both before and after the offspring hatch. They will incubate their eggs for about 20–23 days. Male parents of first clutches may father chicks in later male's clutches, probably due to sperm storage within female reproductive tracts, which is common in birds. Females that fail to find additional mates usually help incubate and rear chicks. "Prior to incubation, blood plasma concentrations of testosterone and dihydrotestosterone are substantially higher in males than in females" and these levels plummet 25-fold in males as incubation proceeds. Additionally, mated females have testosterone concentrations that are 7 times higher than those of unmated females. Due to their polyandrous behavior, spotted sandpipers tend to produce more offspring compared to other species of sandpipers.

=== Food and feeding ===
These birds forage on the ground or in water, picking up food by sight. They may also catch insects in flight. They eat insects (such as flies, beetles, grasshoppers, mayflies, midges, crickets and caterpillars), crustaceans and other invertebrates (such as spiders, snails, other molluscs, and worms), as well as small fish and carrion. As they forage, they can be recognized by their constant nodding and teetering.

== Predators ==
The main predators of spotted sandpipers include raptors, mustelids, mice, and gulls. Most of these predators target the sandpipers' chicks and eggs.

== Conservation status ==
Although there has been some decline in the population of spotted sandpipers, their conservation status is currently of least concern. However, the decrease in the population of spotted sandpipers is not projected to slow or stop in the future. The destruction of their natural habitats due to increasing wildfires causes problems for breeding and raising offspring. Additionally, the gradual increase in temperatures poses a problem for newborn sandpipers.

== Etymology ==
Actitis comes from aktítēs, meaning "coast-dweller" in ancient Greek, while macularius comes from the Latin word for "spotted".

== Gallery ==
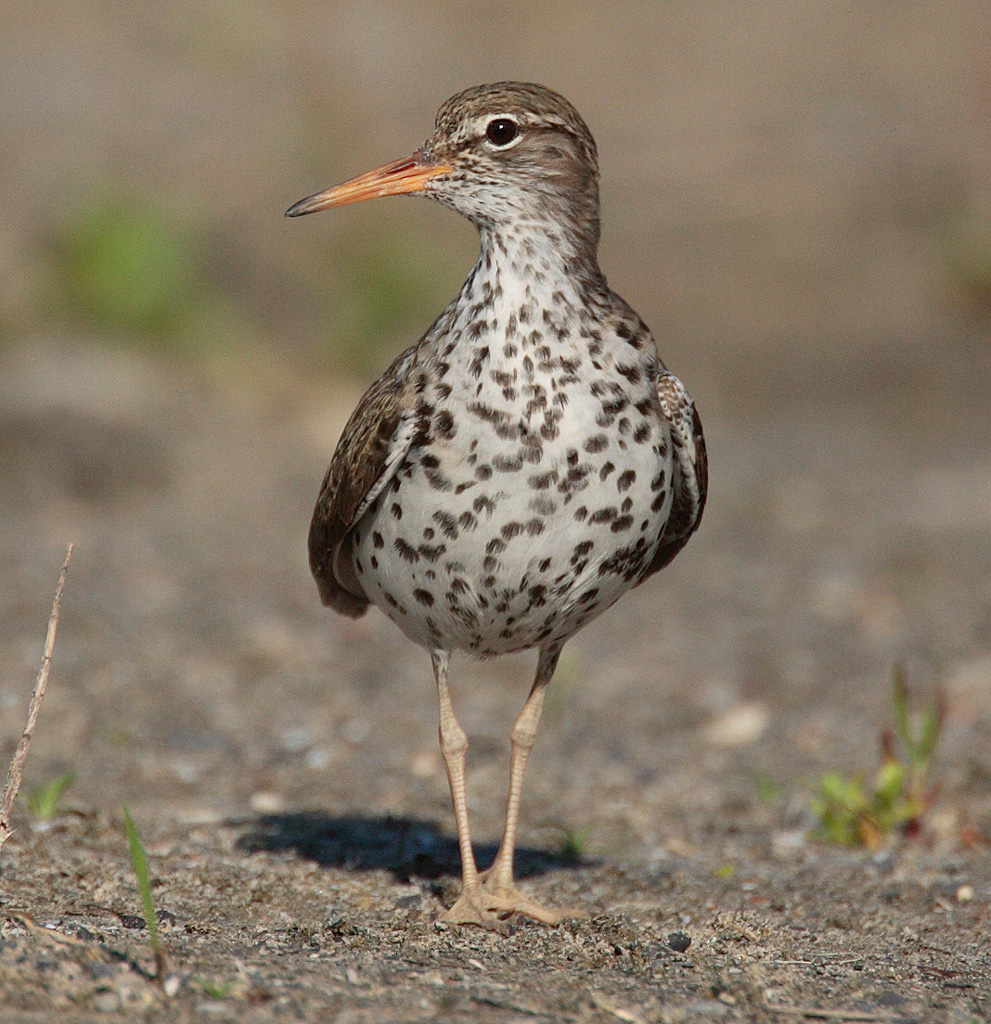
Front view in Toronto, Ontario

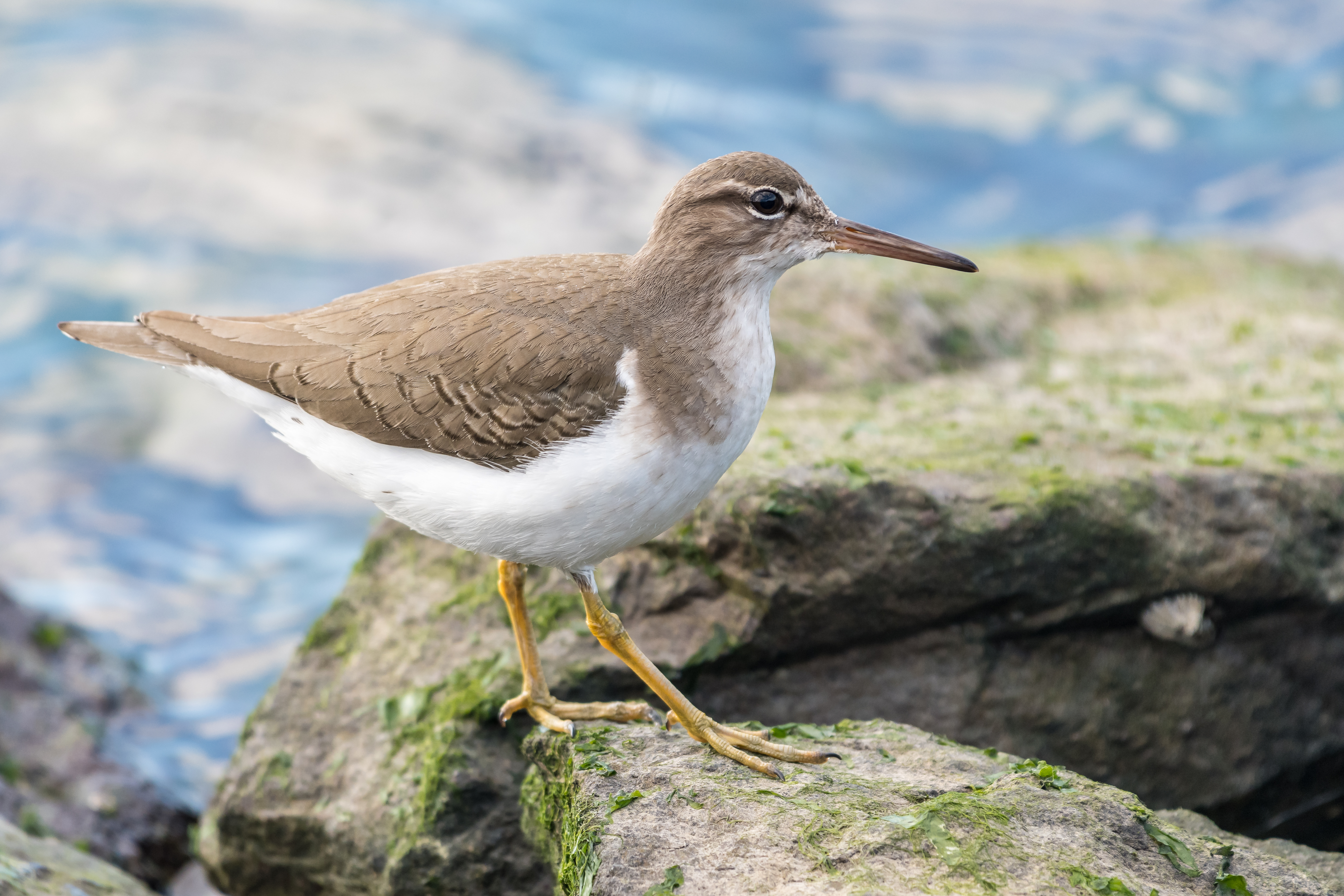
Non-breeding plumage at the Richmond Marina in Richmond, California

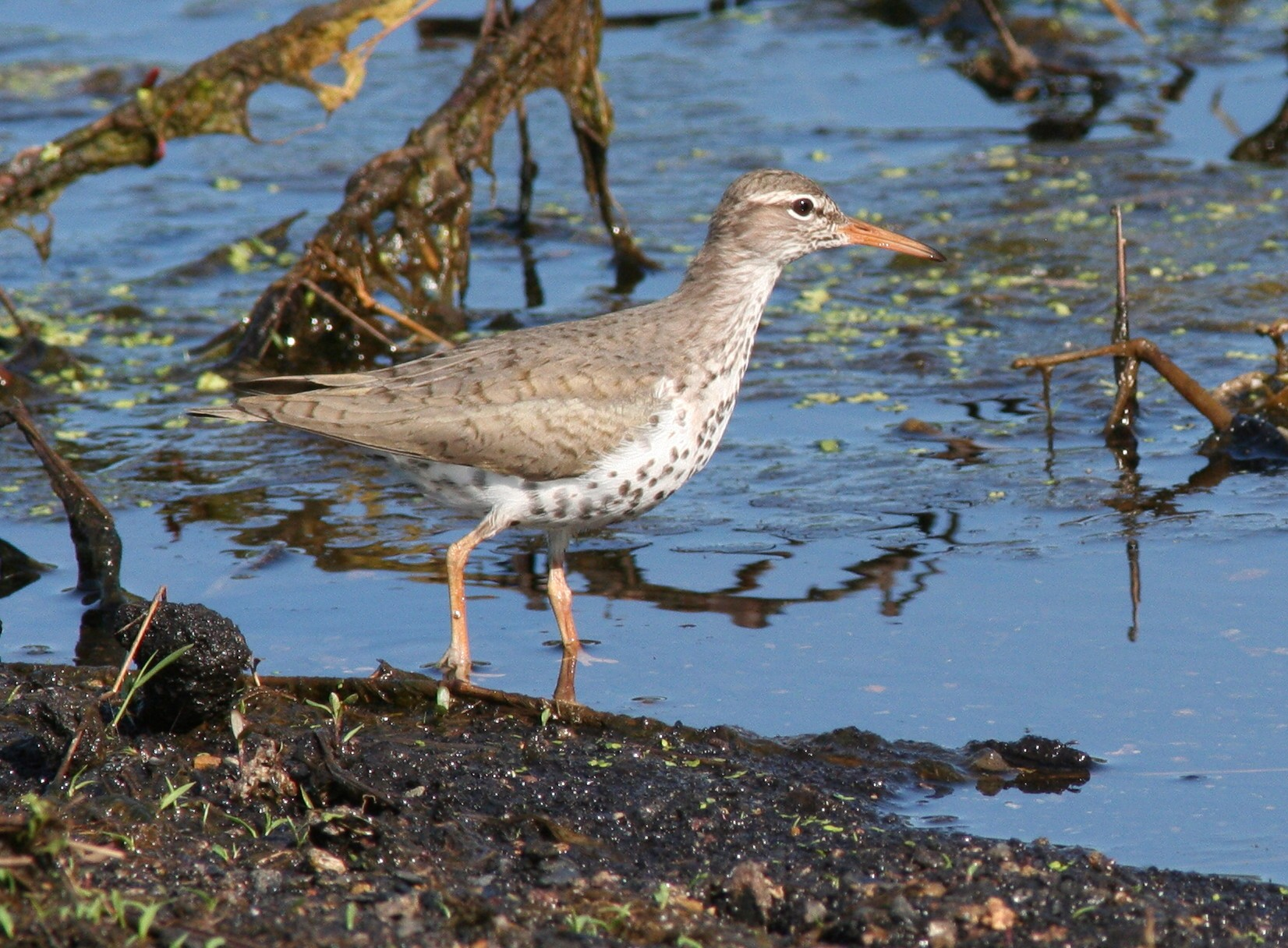
Spotted sandpiper hunting in the Wallkill River National Wildlife Refuge in New Jersey and New York

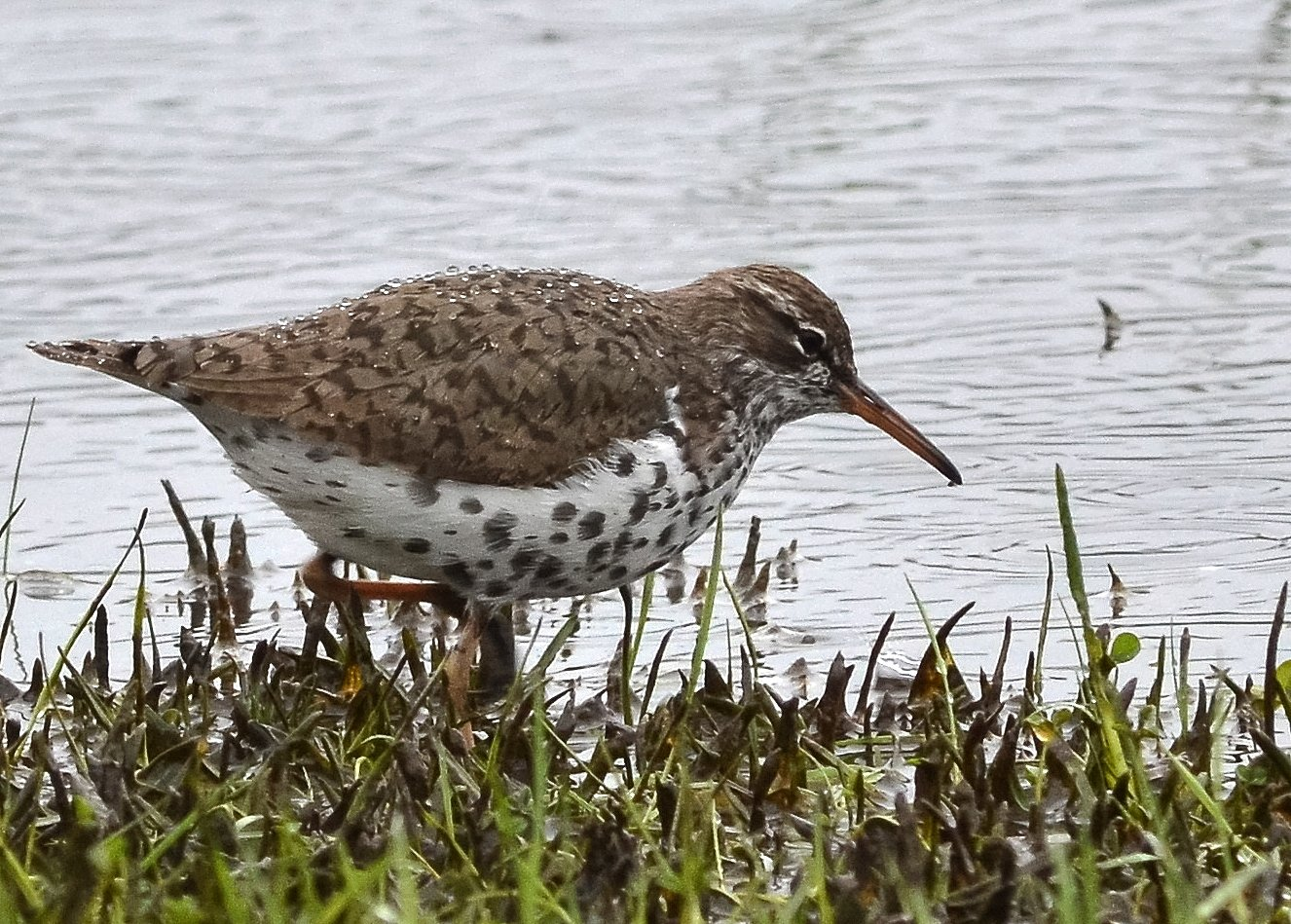
Spotted sandpiper foraging in Fox River Grove, Illinois

=== Video ===
A spotted sandpiper, or "teeterpeep", displaying its trademark bobbing-motion while foraging in a harbor in Oakland, California.
