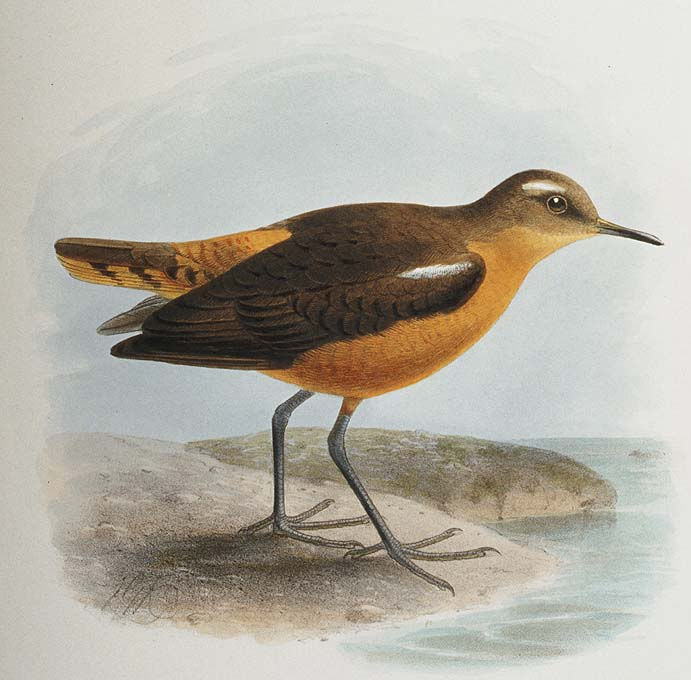
- Prosobonia leucoptera

Scientific classification
- Domain: Eukaryota
- Kingdom: Animalia
- Phylum: Chordata
- Class: Aves
- Order: Charadriiformes
- Family: Scolopacidae
- Subfamily: Calidrinae
- Genus: Prosobonia; Bonaparte, 1850

Type species
- Tringa leucoptera (Tahiti sandpiper) JF Gmelin, 1789

Species
- See text.

Synonyms
- Aechmorhynchus Coues, 1874

= Polynesian sandpiper =

Genus of birds

The Polynesian sandpipers form the genus Prosobonia. They are small wading birds confined to remote Pacific islands of French Polynesia. Only one species is now extant, and it is rare and little known. This bird is sometimes separated in the genus Aechmorhynchus, restricting the genus to the extinct southern forms.

== Taxonomy ==
The genus Prosobonia was introduced in 1850 by the French naturalist Charles Lucien Bonaparte with the Tahiti sandpiper, as the type species. Bonaparte did not explain the etymology of the genus name but it is probably from the Ancient Greek prosōpon meaning "mask" or "face".

The International Ornithologists' Union lists four species in the genus. Of these three have become extinct in historical times.

- Tuamotu sandpiper, P. parvirostris
- † Kiritimati sandpiper, P. cancellata
- † Tahiti sandpiper, P. leucoptera
- † Moorea sandpiper, P. ellisi

An additional species was described in 2020 from subfossil remains.

- † Henderson sandpiper P. sauli

Indeterminate species are also known from the Marquesas and the Cook Islands.

== Description ==
The Tuamotu sandpiper, P. parvirostris, is a unique short-billed all-brown wader previously found over a large area of the Pacific, but now confined to a few islands in the Tuamotu archipelago and still declining. Its decline appears to be due to human habitation encroachment and introduced mammals. It feeds on insects, but takes some vegetable material from its coastal haunts. It nests on the ground, and has a soft piping call.

The extinct Tahiti sandpiper, P. leucoptera of Tahiti was similar in size and shape to P. cancellata. It had brown upperparts, reddish underparts, a white wingbar, and some white on the face and throat. It became extinct in the 19th century, and little is known of it.

There was a similar bird on Moorea which differed in some minor details from P. leucoptera, notably the larger extent of white in the wing, and has been described as the Moorea sandpiper (P. ellisi). However, although two species are generally listed, the question whether they actually did constitute separate species is probably unresolvable as only a single specimen of it exists today, apart from some contemporary paintings.

From Mangaia in the Cook Islands, Ua Huka in the Marquesas, and the remote South Pacific Henderson Island subfossil remains of Prosobonia have been recovered but not yet named. The first of these was almost certainly more closely related to the Tahiti and Moorea populations than to the Tuamotu sandpiper, but the exact nature of their relationship is unlikely to be resolved anytime soon. It disappeared in the early-mid 1st millennium AD, probably not long after 300 AD.

The Ua Huka and Henderson forms can be assumed to have been closer to the living species. The latter, a distinct species with long legs and short wings, became extinct only about 1000 years after the Mangaia form, some time after 1200.

In 2020 a new extinct species, Prosobonia sauli, was described from specimens found on Henderson Island, part of the Pitcairn Islands. A genetic analysis found that the genus was sister to the clade containing Arenaria and Calidris.
