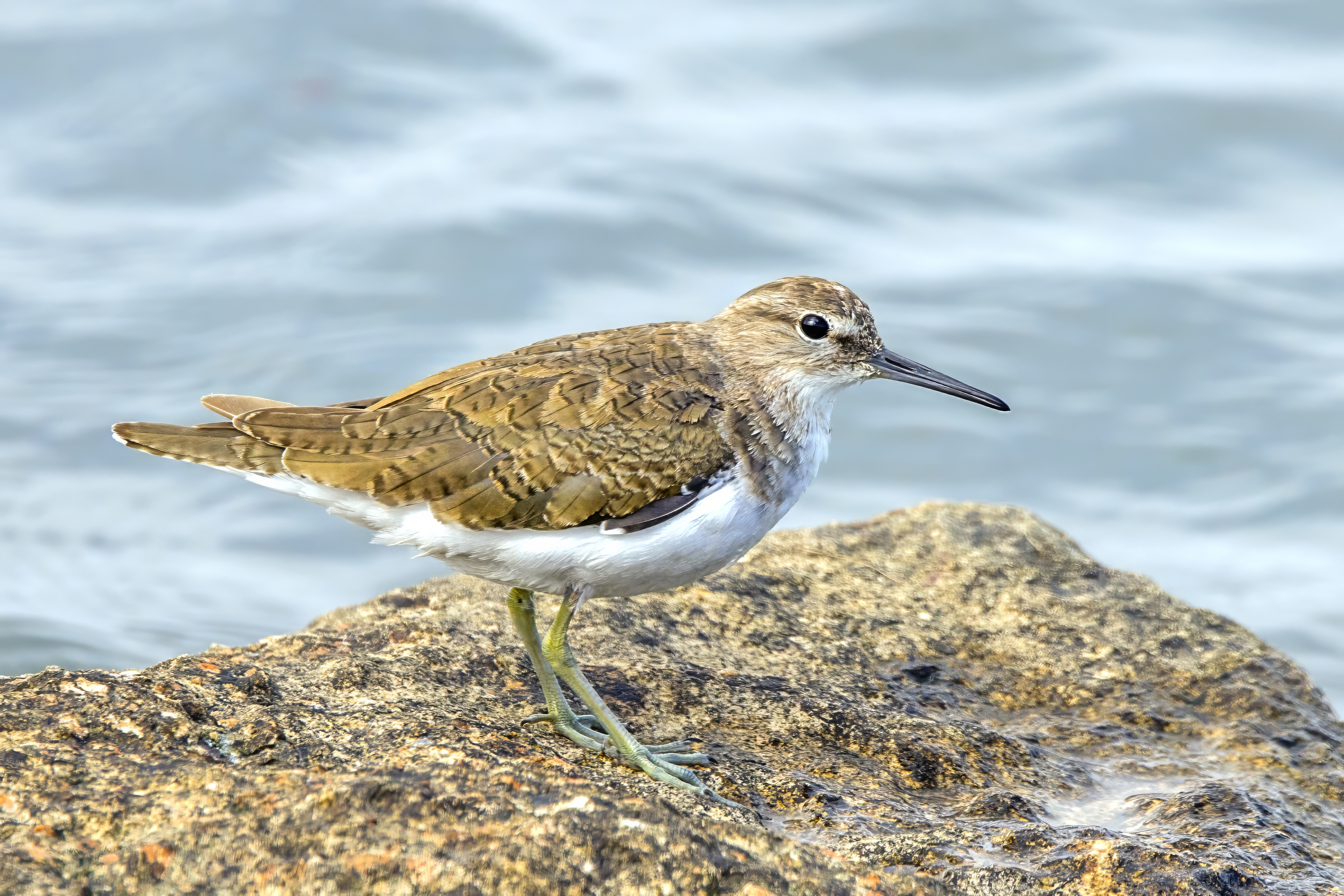
- Common sandpiper, Actitis hypoleucos

Scientific classification
- Kingdom: Animalia
- Phylum: Chordata
- Class: Aves
- Order: Charadriiformes
- Family: Scolopacidae
- Genus: Actitis; Illiger, 1811

Type species
- Tringa hypoleucos (common sandpiper) Linnaeus, 1758

Species
- Actitis hypoleucos Actitis macularius

= Actitis =

Genus of birds

Actitis is a small genus of waders, comprising two similar bird species.

== Taxonomy ==
The genus Actitis was introduced in 1811 by the German zoologist Johann Illiger. The genus name is from Ancient Greek aktites, "coast-dweller" from akte, "coast". The type species is the common sandpiper. The genus is sister to the genus Tringa, which contains the shanks and the tattlers.

The genus contains two species:

Genus Actitis – Illiger, 1811 – two species
Common name	Scientific name and subspecies	Range	Size and ecology	IUCN status and estimated population
Common sandpiper	Actitis hypoleucos (Linnaeus, 1758)	Eurasia	Size: Habitat: Diet:	LC
Spotted sandpiper	Actitis macularius (Linnaeus, 1766)	North America	Size: Habitat: Diet:	LC

== Description ==
The two Actitis species are both small migratory waders, greyish brown on top and white underneath, with a distinctive stiff-winged flight low over the water. The plumages are very similar, apart from spotted sandpipers' distinctive breeding plumage, and suspected out-of-range vagrants must be carefully observed for identification to species.

Both species have short yellow or yellowish legs and a medium bill. These are not gregarious birds and are seldom seen in large flocks.

They nest on the ground, and their habitat is near fresh water. These birds forage on the ground or in water, picking up food by sight. They may also catch insects in flight. They eat insects, crustaceans and other invertebrates.

Actitis is part of the shank-tattler-phalarope clade and less closely related to the calidrid sandpipers. Based on the degree of DNA sequence divergence and putative shank and phalarope fossils from around the Oligocene/Miocene boundary some 23–22 million years ago, presumably Actitis diverged from its closest relatives in the Late Oligocene; given the much higher diversity of the prehistoric members of the group in Eurasia it is likely that they originated there, possibly being isolated as the remains of the Turgai Sea dried up.

The Late Pliocene fossil described as Actitis balcanica appears to actually originate from an indeterminate charadriid.
