= William Wade Ellis =

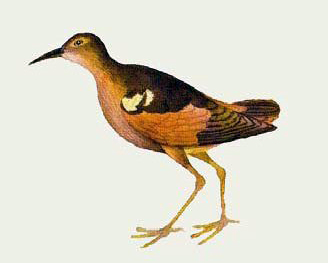
A 1777 illustration of the Moorea Sandpiper (Prosobonia ellisi) by Ellis.

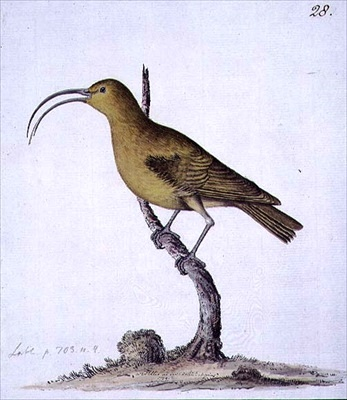
The now extinct Lesser 'akialoa (Hemignathus obscurus), illustration by Ellis.

William Wade Ellis (1751 – 1785) was an artist, a naturalist, and a surgeon's mate on Captain James Cook's voyages. His middle name was wrongly identified as Webb in some sources. He is known largely from the paintings of natural history subjects that he made during Captain Cook's voyages. Ellis was baptized on 11 June 1751 at Ely Cathedral, born to Thomas, canon at Ely Cathedral, and Elizabeth. A brother of Ellis' became a vicar at Melbourn, Cambridgeshire.

Little is known of his early life, but he was described by David Samwell, surgeon on HMS Discovery, as "a genteel young fellow and of good education". He served on all three of Captain Cook's voyages and may have improved his artistic skills through the influence of John Webber after moving from HMS Discovery to HMS Resolution. Descriptions of specimens in his notebooks suggest that he was scientifically trained and had a knowledge of Latin but claims that he trained at Cambridge University and at St. Bartholomew's Hospital have not been supported by evidence.

Ellis met Joseph Banks and gave him some of his drawings, hoping to be remunerated. Owing to financial difficulties, Ellis took up an offer to write an account of Cook's third voyage, published in 1782. However, due to a breach of terms in the contract, Ellis was not paid for the book's sales.

In 1785, he left to join the Queen Charlotte on a voyage to northwest America. On this voyage, Ellis had an accident at Ostend, Belgium, falling from the mast of the Queen Charlotte. Ellis died from these injuries.
