= William Anderson (naturalist) =

Scottish naturalist

- Born: 28 December 1750; North Berwick, East Lothian, Scotland
- Died: 3 June 1778 (aged 27); Bering Sea
- Occupation: Naturalist
- Known for: Companion of explorer James Cook

William Anderson (28 December 1750 in North Berwick, East Lothian – 3 August 1778 in the Bering Sea) was a Scottish naturalist known for accompanying James Cook on his voyages.

== Biography ==
One of the seven children Jean (née Melvil) and Robert Anderson, a schoolmaster. Anderson studied medicine at the University of Edinburgh from 1766–68. He enlisted in the navy and qualified on 1 December 1768 as surgeon's first mate, being promoted to surgeon on 1 November 1770 and posted to the vessel HMS Barfleur (1768–1819).

Anderson accompanied James Cook on his second voyage, boarding the Resolution on 12 December 1771 as surgeon's mate. Anderson proved to be diligent and was chosen to accompany Cook on his third voyage as surgeon and naturalist, joining the Resolution again on 15 February 1776.

Though he had received no formal training as a naturalist, Anderson proved to be more than capable. He described and put together a large collection of specimens for Joseph Banks and added considerably to the knowledge of Pacific languages. He is commemorated by the botanical genus Andersonia R.Br. and Stylidium subgenus Andersonia.

Anderson died of tuberculosis on 3 August 1778 while the Resolution was on the Bering Sea. Shortly before dying he made a will leaving most of his estate to his sisters, Beth and Robinah, and to his mother's brother, William Melvil. In a letter to the Earl of Sandwich, Joseph Banks states that Anderson's family received the moneys due to them.

Disturbed by Anderson's death, Cook wrote:

He was a sensible young man, an agreeable companion, well skilled in his profession ... and to perpetuate the memory of the deceased for whom I had a very great regard, I named [it] Andersons Island.

Cook, though, had become confused and tried to rename St. Lawrence Island. Anderson Point in Nootka Sound commemorates William Anderson.

== See also ==
- European and American voyages of scientific exploration
