= List of Charadriiformes by population =

This is a list of Charadriiformes species by global population. Charadriiformes (Charadrius being Latin for "plover") is the taxonomic order to which the waders, gulls, and auks belong. While numbers are estimates, they have been made by the experts in their fields.

Not all Charadriiformes have had their numbers quantified, but species without population estimates are included in a secondary table below.

The Charadriiformes were sometimes grouped with the Ciconiiformes in older taxonomic systems (e.g., Sibley-Ahlquist taxonomy). However, the American Ornithological Society, International Ornithologists' Union (IOC) and BirdLife International, which informs IUCN taxonomy, now agree on it being a separate order following more recent genetic analyses.

A variety of methods are used for counting Charadriiformes. For example, the piping plover is subject to the quinquennial Piping Plover International Census, which is carried out in 9 Canadian provinces, 32 US states, Mexico, Central America, and the Caribbean. In the 2006 survey, Saskatchewan alone had 159 volunteers scour 294 waterbodies. The mountain plover has had its nests counted through the drive transect method. Once density has been calculated, the numbers are extrapolated over a bird's range. For more information on how these estimates were ascertained, see Wikipedia's articles on population biology and population ecology.

The IOC World Bird List (version 15.1) recognizes 392 species of Charadriiformes, eight of which are extinct. There are several disagreements about the species status of taxa within Charadriiformes. As of January 2026, IOC lists ten species which are considered subspecies by IUCN/BirdLife International. Similarly, IUCN/BirdLife International list three species which still have subspecies status in IOC taxonomies. See 'Notes' column of included tables for more information on these taxonomic disputes.

This list follows IUCN classifications for species names and taxonomy. Where IUCN classifications differ from other ornithological authorities, alternative names and taxonomies are noted.

Some members of Charadriiformes are extinct:

- Christmas sandpiper, or Kiritimati sandpiper (Prosobonia cancellata) - likely extinct by 1860.
- Tahiti sandpiper (Prosobonia leucoptera) - last seen in 1777, when only specimen was collected.
- Moorea sandpiper (Prosobonia ellisi) - last seen in 1777, when only specimen was collected.
- Canarian oystercatcher, or Canary Islands oystercatcher (Haematopus meadewaldoi) - last specimen collected in 1913; last observations occurred in 1940s.
- Great auk (Pinguinus impennis) - extinct from being hunted; last observed in 1852.
- Slender-billed curlew (Numenius tenuirostris) - last observed in 1995; declared extinct in 2025.
- North Island snipe (Coenocorypha barrierensis) - last recorded in 1870.
- South Island snipe (Coenocorypha iredalei) - last recorded in 1964.

== Species by global population ==
Common name	Binomial name	Population	Status	Trend	Notes	Image
Javan lapwing	Vanellus macropterus	0-49	CR	▼	May be extinct. Last confirmed sighting was in 1939.	
Eskimo curlew	Numenius borealis	0-49	CR	?	May be extinct. Last confirmed sighting in 1963.	
New Caledonian buttonquail	Turnix novaecaledoniae	0-49	CR	?	May be extinct. Last sighting was in 1911.	
Black stilt	Himantopus novaezelandiae	1-49	CR	?	Population consists primarily of captive-reared birds, which are not counted toward IUCN population estimates. Total population numbered 156 individuals as of 2023.	
Jerdon's courser	Rhinoptilus bitorquatus	1-50	CR	?	Probably still extant, but no confirmed observations since 2009.	
Buff-breasted buttonquail	Turnix olivii	1-249	CR	?	May be extinct. Best estimate for number of mature individuals is 1-49.	
Chinese crested tern	Thalasseus bernsteini	30-49	CR	▼		
Southern red-breasted plover (Southern New Zealand dotterel; New Zealand plover)	Anarhynchus obscurus	60-80	CR	▼	Total population is estimated to be 120 individuals. Note that IUCN/BirdLife International split New Zealand dotterel into two species – this one and the northern red-breasted plover. IOC taxonomy maintains both of these species as New Zealand plover (Anarhynchus obscurus).	
Shore plover	Thinornis novaeseelandiae	170	EN	▲	Estimate from 2021/22 counts of 85 breeding pairs.	
Chatham Islands oystercatcher	Haematopus chathamensis	200-249	EN	Steady		
Spoon-billed sandpiper	Calidris pygmaea	240-620	CR	▼	Best estimate for number of mature individuals is 490.	
Magellanic plover	Pluvianellus socialis	250-999	VU	Steady	Best estimate for number of mature individuals is 330.	
Plains-wanderer	Pedionomus torquatus	251-5,000	EN	▼	Population varies substantially based on drought conditions. Best estimate for number of mature individuals is 251–1,000.	
Australian painted-snipe	Rostratula australis	270-410	EN	▼	Best estimate for number of mature individuals is 340.	
Saint Helena plover	Anarhynchus sanctaehelenae	545	VU	▲	IUCN/BirdLife International place this species in genus Charadrius.	
Lava gull	Leucophaeus fuliginosus	600-800	VU	Steady	Total population has been estimated to be 900–1,200 individuals. May be an overestimate. IUCN/BirdLife International place species in genus Larus.	
Peruvian tern	Sternula lorata	600-1,700	EN	▼	Total population is estimated to be 1,000-2,499 individuals.	
Snowy-crowned tern	Sterna trudeaui	670-6,700	LC	Steady	Total population is estimated to be 1,000-10,000 individuals.	
Tuamotu sandpiper	Prosobonia parvirostris	700-1,100	EN	▼	Maximum estimate for total population is 1,600 individuals.	
Madagascar jacana	Actophilornis albinucha	780-1,643	EN	▼	Total population is estimated to be 975–2,064 individuals.	
Black-bellied tern	Sterna acuticauda	800-1,600	EN	▼	Best estimate for number of mature individuals is 900–1,100.	
Spotted greenshank (Nordmann's greenshank)	Tringa guttifer	900-1,600	EN	▼	Total population is estimated to be 1,500-2,000 individuals.	
Snares Island snipe (Snares snipe)	Coenocorypha huegeli	1,000-1,500	NT	Steady		
Black-fronted tern	Chlidonias albostriatus	1,000-5,000	EN	▼	Total population is estimated to be 1,827-10,611 individuals.	
Long-billed plover	Charadrius placidus	1,000-10,000	LC	?	Values given are for total population. Estimate is an uncertain one; range and habitat are largely unsurveyed.	
Belcher's gull	Larus belcheri	1,000-10,000	LC	▲	Values given are for total population.	
Javan plover	Anarhynchus javanicus	1,300-4,000	LC	Steady	Total population is estimated to be 2,000-6,000 individuals, though it is likely to be larger. IUCN/BirdLife International place this species in genus Charadrius.	
Diademed plover (Diademed sandpiper-plover)	Phegornis mitchellii	1,500-7,000	NT	▼	Total population is estimated to be 2,500-9,999 individuals.	
Chatham Islands snipe	Coenocorypha pusilla	1,800-2,200	VU	Steady	Total population is estimated to be 2,700-3,300 individuals.	
Black-banded plover (Madagascar plover)	Anarhynchus thoracicus	1,800-2,300	VU	▼	Total population is estimated to be 2,700-3,500 individuals. IUCN/BirdLife International place this species in genus Charadrius.	
Northern red-breasted plover (Northern New Zealand dotterel; New Zealand plover)	Anarhynchus aquilonius	1,900	LC	▲	Total population is estimated to be 2,600 individuals. Note that IUCN/BirdLife International split New Zealand dotterel into two species – this one and the southern red-breasted plover. IOC taxonomy maintains both of these species as New Zealand plover (Anarhynchus obscurus).	
Imperial snipe	Gallinago imperialis	2,100-5,400	NT	▼	Total population is estimated to be 3,000-6,000 individuals.	
Damara tern	Sternula balaenarum	2,200-5,700	LC	▼		
Kerguelen tern	Sterna virgata	2,300-4,300	NT	Steady	Total population is estimated to be 3,500-6,500 individuals.	
Indian skimmer	Rynchops albicollis	2,450-2,900	EN	▼	Total population is estimated to be 3,700-4,400 individuals.	
Madagascar snipe	Gallinago macrodactyla	2,500-9,999	VU	▼		
Wood snipe	Gallinago nemoricola	2,500-9,999	VU	▼		
Fairy tern	Sternula nereis	2,500-9,999	VU	▼		
Fuegian snipe	Gallinago stricklandii	2,500-9,999	NT	▼		
Amami woodcock	Scolopax mira	2,500-9,999	NT	?		
Javan woodcock	Scolopax saturata	2,500-9,999	NT	▼		
Chilean skua	Catharacta chilensis	2,500-9,999	LC	Steady	Tentative estimate; may be an underestimate.	
Andean avocet	Recurvirostra andina	2,500-9,999	LC	Steady	Best estimate for number of mature individuals is 5,000.	
Spot-breasted lapwing	Vanellus melanocephalus	2,500-9,999	LC	?	Total population is tentatively estimated to be <10,000 individuals.	
Noble snipe	Gallinago nobilis	2,500-15,000	NT	▼		
Peruvian thick-knee	Burhinus superciliaris	2,700-3,600	VU	▼	Total population is estimated to be 4,550 individuals.	
Wrybill	Anarhynchus frontalis	3,000-3,300	VU	▼	Total population is estimated to be 4,500-5,000 individuals.	
Black-breasted buttonquail	Turnix melanogaster	3,000-6,500	VU	▼	Best estimate for number of mature individuals is 4,800.	
Madagascar pratincole	Glareola ocularis	3,300-6,700	NT	▼	Total population is estimated to be 5,000-10,000 individuals.	
Andean snipe (Jameson's snipe)	Gallinago jamesoni	3,900-5,200	LC	?	Total population is estimated to be 6,500 individuals.	
Puna plover	Anarhynchus alticola	4,000-7,000	LC	?	Total population is estimated to be 8,350 individuals. IUCN/BirdLife International place species in genus Charadrius.	
Beach thick-knee (Beach stone-curlew)	Esacus magnirostris	4,100-8,000	NT	▼		
African oystercatcher	Haematopus moquini	4,450	LC	▲	Total population is estimated to be 6,670 individuals.	
Guadalupe murrelet	Synthliboramphus hypoleucus	5,000	EN	▼	Total population is estimated to be 7,500 individuals.	
Malay plover (Malaysian plover)	Anarhynchus peronii	5,000-15,000	NT	▼	Best estimate for number of mature individuals is 10,000-15,000. IUCN/BirdLife International place this species in genus Charadrius.	
White-bellied seedsnipe	Attagis malouinus	5,000-20,000	LC	Steady	Total population is estimated to be 8,000-25,000 individuals.	
Puna snipe	Gallinago andina	5,000-20,000	LC	Steady	Total population is estimated to be 0,000-25,000 individuals.	
Variable oystercatcher	Haematopus unicolor	5,000-20,000	LC	▲		
Japanese murrelet	Synthliboramphus wumizusume	5,200-9,400	VU	▼		
Hooded plover	Thinornis cucullatus	5,350-5,500	NT	▼		
Pied oystercatcher	Haematopus longirostris	6,000-8,000	LC	▲	Total population is estimated to be 11,000 individuals.	
South polar skua	Stercorarius maccormicki	6,000-15,000	LC	Steady	Total population is estimated to be 10,000-19,999 individuals. IUCN/BirdLife International place this species in genus Catharacta.	
White-fronted tern	Sterna striata	6,120-25,120	NT	▼		
Dolphin gull	Leucophaeus scoresbii	6,700-19,000	LC	Steady	Total population is estimated to be 10,000-28,000 individuals. IUCN/BirdLife International place species in genus Larus.	
Forbes's plover	Charadrius forbesi	6,700-33,300	LC	?	Total population is estimated to be 10,000-50,000 individuals.	
Piping plover	Charadrius melodus	7,600-8,400	NT	▲	Total population is estimated to be 11,500-12,500 individuals.	
Sooty oystercatcher	Haematopus fuliginosus	7,700	LC	▲	Total population is estimated to be 11,500 individuals.	
Black-fronted dotterel	Charadrius melanops	7,800-17,800	LC	?	Total population is estimated to be 11,700-26,700 individuals. IUCN/BirdLife International place this species in genus Elseyornis.	
Craveri's murrelet	Synthliboramphus craveri	8,000	VU	▼	Total population is estimated to be 12,000 individuals.	
Double-banded plover	Anarhynchus bicinctus	8,000-14,000	NT	▼	Best estimate for number of mature individuals is 13,000. Total population is estimated to be 13,000 - 20,000 individuals. IUCN/BirdLife International places this species in genus Charadrius.	
South American painted-snipe	Nycticryphes semicollaris	8,000-100,000	NT	▼	Best estimate for number of mature individuals is 10,000-50,000.	
Giant snipe	Gallinago undulata	8,500	LC	▼	Total population is estimated to be 12,700 individuals.	
Black-faced sheathbill	Chionis minor	8,700-13,000	LC	▼	Total population is estimated to be 13,000-20,000 individuals.	
Inland dotterel	Peltohyas australis	9,300	LC	Steady	Total population is estimated to be 14,000 individuals.	
Black-winged lapwing	Vanellus melanopterus	9,300-42,000	LC	?	Total population is estimated to be 14,000-63,000 individuals.	
Moluccan woodcock	Scolopax rochussenii	9,530-19,059	VU	▼		
Olrog's gull	Larus atlanticus	9,800-15,600	NT	Steady		
Bristle-thighed curlew	Numenius tahitiensis	10,000	NT	▼		
Bush thick-knee (Bush stone-curlew)	Burhinus grallarius	10,000-15,000	LC	▼		
African skimmer	Rynchops flavirostris	10,000-17,000	LC	▼	Total population is estimated to be 15,000-25,000 individuals.	
Relict gull	Ichthyaetus relictus	10,000-19,999	VU	▼	Total population is estimated to be 15,000-30,000 individuals. IUCN/BirdLife International place species in genus Larus.	
Scripps's murrelet	Synthliboramphus scrippsi	10,000-19,999	VU	▼	Total population is estimated to be 15,000-30,000 individuals.	
Brown-chested lapwing	Vanellus superciliosus	10,000-19,999	LC	?	Total population is estimated to be 1-25,000 individuals. Wide estimate comes from uncertainty of threats to species.	
Three-banded courser	Rhinoptilus cinctus	10,000-23,300	LC	?	Total population is estimated to be 15,000-35,000 individuals.	
River lapwing	Vanellus duvaucelii	10,000-25,000	NT	▼		
Grey pratincole	Glareola cinerea	10,000-25,000	LC	▼	Total population is estimated to be <35,000 individuals.	
Burchell's courser	Cursorius rufus	10,000-25,000	LC	Steady	Total population is estimated to be <35,000 individuals.	
Grey-breasted seedsnipe	Thinocorus orbignyianus	10,000-25,000	LC	Steady	Values given are for total population. May be an underestimate.	
Andean lapwing	Vanellus resplendens	10,000-25,000	LC	Steady	Values given are for total population. May be an underestimate.	
Pacific gull	Larus pacificus	11,000	LC	Steady	Value given is for total population.	
Sociable lapwing	Vanellus gregarius	11,200	CR	▼	Total population is estimated to be 16,000-17,000 individuals.	
Chestnut-banded plover	Anarhynchus pallidus	11,500-14,900	LC	Steady	Total population is estimated to be 17,500-22,500 individuals. IUCN/BirdLife International place this species in genus Charadrius.	
Egyptian plover	Pluvianus aegyptius	14,000-50,000	LC	▲	Total population is estimated to be 21,001-75,000 individuals.	
Saunders's gull	Saundersilarus saundersi	14,400	VU	▼	Total population is estimated to be 21,000-22,000 individuals.	
Ross's gull	Rhodostethia rosea	15,000-70,000	LC	?	Total population is estimated to be 25,000-100,000 individuals.	
Banded lapwing	Vanellus tricolor	16,600-67,000	LC	Steady	Total population is estimated to be 25,000-100,000 individuals.	
Long-toed stint	Calidris subminuta	16,700	LC	▼	Total population is estimated to be 25,000 individuals.	
Senegal lapwing	Vanellus lugubris	16,700-46,700	LC	?	Total population is estimated to be 25,000-70,000 individuals.	
Red-kneed dotterel	Erythrogonys cinctus	16,700-66,700	LC	Steady	Total population is estimated to be 25,000-100,000 individuals.	
Pied plover	Hoploxypterus cayanus	16,700-66,700	LC	Steady	Total population is estimated to be 25,000-100,000 individuals.	
Lesser jacana	Microparra capensis	16,700-66,700	LC	?	Total population is estimated to be 25,000-100,000 individuals.	
Yellow-billed tern	Sternula superciliaris	16,700-66,700	LC	Steady	Total population is estimated to be 25,000-100,000 individuals.	
Australian pratincole	Stiltia isabella	16,700-66,700	LC	?	Total population is estimated to be 25,000-100,000 individuals.	
Grey-headed lapwing	Vanellus cinereus	16,700-66,700	LC	Steady	Total population is estimated to be 25,000-100,000 individuals.	
Water thick-knee	Burhinus vermiculatus	16,700-83,300	LC	?	Total population is estimated to be 25,001-125,000 individuals.	
Black-headed lapwing	Vanellus tectus	16,700-683,000	LC	?	Total population is estimated to be 25,001-1,025,000 individuals.	
Wandering tattler	Tringa incanus	18,000	LC	?		
Siberian sandplover	Anarhynchus mongolus	18,000-50,000	EN	▼	Estimate is highly uncertain, given uncertainty around taxonomic splits. IUCN/BirdLife International places this species in genus Charadrius.	
Mountain plover	Anarhynchus montanus	20,000	NT	▼	IUCN/BirdLife International place this species in genus Charadrius.	
Asian dowitcher	Limnodromus semipalmatus	20,000-30,000	NT	?		
Pheasant-tailed jacana	Hydrophasianus chirurgus	20,000-33,300	LC	?	Total population is estimated to be 30,000-50,000 individuals.	
Far Eastern curlew	Numenius madagascariensis	20,000-35,000	EN	▼	Best estimate for number of mature individuals is 21,000-28,000.	
Latham's snipe	Gallinago hardwickii	20,000-39,000	NT	▼		
Auckland snipe (Subantarctic snipe)	Coenocorypha aucklandica	20,000-49,999	NT	Steady		
Atlantic white tern (White tern)	Gygis alba	20,000-49,999	LC	Steady	IUCN/BirdLife International split white tern into three species, Atlantic, Common (G. candida), and Little (G. microrhyncha) white terns. IOC taxonomy maintains all three species within G. alba.	
River tern	Sterna aurantia	20,000-70,000	VU	▼	Total population is estimated to be 30,000-100,000 individuals.	
White-tailed lapwing	Vanellus leucurus	20,000-130,000	LC	?	Values given are for total population. European subpopulation estimated at 1,100-10,200 mature individuals.	
African snipe	Gallinago nigripennis	20,000-150,000	LC	?	Total population is estimated to be 30,000-225,000 individuals.	
Blackish oystercatcher	Haematopus ater	21,300-89,300	LC	?	Total population is estimated to be 32,000-134,000 individuals. Note that IOC taxonomy splits an additional species, the black oystercatcher (H. bachmani) from this species. IUCN/BirdLife International maintain both species within H. ater.	
Fynbos buttonquail	Turnix hottentottus	22,248-88,553	LC	▼	Total population is estimated to be 33,206-132,169 individuals.	
Large-billed tern	Phaetusa simplex	23,300-83,300	LC	Steady	Total population is estimated to be 35,000-125,000 individuals.	
Bronze-winged courser	Rhinoptilus chalcopterus	23,300-687,000	LC	▼	Total population is estimated to be 35,000-1,030,000 individuals.	
Snowy plover	Anarhynchus nivosus	24,000-31,000	NT	▼	IUCN/BirdLife International place this species in genus Charadrius.	
Grey gull	Leucophaeus modestus	25,000	LC	▼	Value given is for total population. IUCN/BirdLife International place species in genus Larus.	
Australian gull-billed tern (Australian tern)	Gelochelidon macrotarsa	25,000-100,000	LC	?	Values given are for total population.	
White-faced plover	Anarhynchus dealbatus	25,000-250,000	LC	?	IUCN/BirdLife International place species in genus Charadrius.	
Slaty-backed gull	Larus schistisagus	25,000-1,000,000	LC	?	Values given are for total population.	
Brown skua	Catharacta antarctica	26,000-28,000	LC	▼	Total population is estimated to be 39,000-42,000 individuals.	
Wilson's plover	Anarhynchus wilsonia	26,550-31,650	LC	▼	IUCN/BirdLife International places this species in genus Charadrius.	
Great skua	Stercorarius skua	30,000-34,999	LC	Steady		
Two-banded plover	Anarhynchus falklandicus	30,700-92,700	LC	Steady	Total population is estimated to be 46,000-139,000 individuals. IUCN/BirdLife International place this species in genus Charadrius.	
Magellanic oystercatcher	Haematopus leucopodus	30,700-92,700	LC	?	Total population is estimated to be 46,000-139,000 individuals.	
Aleutian tern	Onychoprion aleuticus	31,000	VU	▼		
Kittlitz's murrelet	Brachyramphus brevirostris	32,000-55,000	NT	▼	Total population is estimated to be 48,000-82,000 individuals.	
Audouin's gull	Ichthyaetus audouinii	33,000-46,000	VU	▼	IUCN/BirdLife International place species in genus Larus.	
Little pratincole (Small pratincole)	Glareola lactea	33,300-66,700	LC	?	Total population is estimated to be 50,000-100,000 individuals.	
Bronze-winged jacana	Metopidius indicus	33,300-66,700	LC	?	Total population is estimated to be 50,000-100,000 individuals.	
Long-toed lapwing	Vanellus crassirostris	33,300-110,000	LC	?	Total population is estimated to be 50,002-165,000 individuals.	
Senegal thick-knee	Burhinus senegalensis	33,300-133,000	LC	?	Total population is estimated to be 50,000-200,000 individuals.	
Somali courser	Cursorius somalensis	33,300-133,000	LC	?	Total population is estimated to be 50,000-200,000 individuals.	
Greater painted-snipe	Rostratula benghalensis	33,300-153,000	LC	?	Total population is estimated to be 50,003-230,000 individuals.	
Rufous-bellied seedsnipe	Attagis gayi	33,300-1,330,000	LC	?	Total population is estimated to be 50,001-2,000,600 individuals.	
Pin-tailed snipe	Gallinago stenura	33,300-1,330,000	LC	?	Total population is estimated to be 50,000-2,000,000 individuals.	
Crab-plover	Dromas ardeola	34,800-46,300	LC	Steady	Total population is estimated to be 52,200-69,500 individuals.	
Swallow-tailed gull	Creagrus furcatus	35,000	LC	?	Value given is a 1984 estimate for total population.	
White-eyed gull	Ichthyaetus leucophthalmus	35,800-37,800	LC	Steady	Total population is estimated to be 53,700-56,700 individuals. IUCN/BirdLife International place species in genus Larus.	
White-crowned lapwing	Vanellus albiceps	37,300-85,300	LC	▼	Total population is estimated to be 56,000-128,000 individuals.	
Ivory gull	Pagophila eburnea	38,000-52,000	NT	▼	Total population is estimated to be 58,000-78,000 individuals.	
Yellow-footed gull	Larus livens	40,000	LC	?	Total population is estimated to be 60,000 individuals.	
Caspian plover	Anarhynchus asiaticus	40,000-55,000	LC	▼	Values given are for total population. IUCN/BirdLife International places this species in genus Charadrius.	
Double-banded courser	Smutsornis africanus	40,000-150,000	LC	Steady	Total population is estimated to be 60,000-225,000 individuals.	
Temminck's courser	Cursorius temminckii	40,000-190,000	LC	?	Total population is estimated to be 60,001-285,000 individuals.	
Hudsonian godwit	Limosa haemastica	41,000-70,000	VU	▼		
Grey-tailed tattler	Tringa brevipes	42,000-49,000	LC	Steady	Total population is estimated to be 70,000 individuals.	
Spotted thick-knee	Burhinus capensis	43,300-143,000	LC	▼	Total population is estimated to be 65,000-215,000 individuals.	
Armenian gull	Larus armenicus	45,000-73,000	LC	▲	Total population is estimated to be 68,000-110,000 individuals.	
African three-banded plover (Three-banded plover)	Charadrius tricollaris	46,700-93,300	LC	▲	Total population is estimated to be 70,001-140,000 individuals.	
Chestnut-backed buttonquail	Turnix castanotus	50,000	LC	Steady	Total population is estimated to be 100,000 individuals, but no data exist to support this guess.	
Common white tern (White tern)	Gygis candida	50,000-99,999	LC	▲	IUCN/BirdLife International split white tern into three species, Common, Atlantic (G. alba), and Little (G. microrhyncha) white terns. IOC taxonomy maintains all three species within G. alba.	
South Island oystercatcher	Haematopus finschi	50,000-99,999	LC	▼	Total population is estimated to be 113,000 individuals.	
American oystercatcher	Haematopus palliatus	50,000-99,999	LC	?	Best estimate for number of mature individuals is 61,000.	
Collared plover	Anarhynchus collaris	50,000-499,999	LC	▼	IUCN/BirdLife International places this species in genus Charadrius.	
Magellanic snipe	Gallinago magellanica	50,000-1,027,000	LC	▼	True population size is likely near upper end of estimate.	
Elegant tern	Thalasseus elegans	51,000-90,000	NT	Steady	Values given are for total population.	
Eurasian dotterel	Eudromias morinellus	51,300-103,000	LC	?	Total population is estimated to be 77,000-155,000 individuals.	
Royal tern	Thalasseus maximus	55,000	LC	Steady	IUCN/BirdLife International do not provide a population estimate. Value reported comes from Partners in Flight Database. Note that IOC taxonomy splits an additional species, the West African crested tern (T. albididoralis), from this species, noting its closer relation to the lesser crested tern. IUCN/BirdLife International maintain T. albididoralis as a subspecies within T. maximus.	
White-fronted plover	Anarhynchus marginatus	57,300-83,300	LC	?	Total population is estimated to be 86,000-125,000 individuals. IUCN/BirdLife International place species in genus Charadrius.	
Sharp-tailed sandpiper	Calidris acuminata	60,000-120,000	VU	▼	Best estimate for number of mature individuals is 73,000.	
Wattled lapwing (African wattled lapwing)	Vanellus senegallus	60,000-210,000	LC	▼	Total population is estimated to be 90,000-315,000 individuals.	
Red-capped plover	Anarhynchus ruficapillus	63,300	LC	?	Total population is estimated to be 95,000 individuals. IUCN/BirdLife International place species in genus Charadrius.	
Long-billed curlew	Numenius americanus	66,000-133,000	LC	Steady	Total population is estimated to be 98,000-198,000 individuals.	
Masked lapwing	Vanellus miles	66,700-667,000	LC	▲	Total population is estimated to be 100,000-1,000,000 individuals.	
Least seedsnipe	Thinocorus rumicivorus	66,700-683,000	LC	?	Total population is estimated to be 99,999-1,024,998 individuals.	
Whiskered auklet	Aethia pygmaea	>67,000	LC	▼	Total population is estimated to be more than 100,000 individuals.	
Blacksmith lapwing	Vanellus armatus	67,000-667,000	LC	▲	Total population is estimated to be 100,000-1,000,000 individuals.	
Surfbird	Calidris virgata	70,000	LC	▼		
Red-necked avocet	Recurvirostra novaehollandiae	71,000	LC	Steady	Total population is estimated to be 107,000 individuals.	
Little curlew	Numenius minutus	73,300	LC	▼	Total population is estimated to be 110,000 individuals.	
Spur-winged lapwing	Vanellus spinosus	83,000-534,000	LC	▲	Total population is estimated to be 125,000-800,000 individuals.	
Rock pratincole	Glareola nuchalis	83,300-267,000	LC	?	Total population is estimated to be 125,000-400,000 individuals.	
Buff-breasted sandpiper	Calidris subruficollis	84,000-364,000	VU	▼		
Rufous-chested plover (Rufous-chested dotterel)	Zonibyx modestus	88,700-709,000	LC	?	Total population is estimated to be 133,000-1,063,000 individuals. IUCN/BirdLife International places this species in genus Charadrius.	
Black-billed gull	Chroicocephalus bulleri	90,000-121,000	NT	?	IUCN/BirdLife International place species in genus Larus.	
Pacific golden plover	Pluvialis fulva	90,000-140,000	LC	▼	Total population is estimated to be 150,000-200,000 individuals.	
Black turnstone	Arenaria melanocephala	95,000	LC	Steady		
Broad-billed sandpiper	Calidris falcinellus	96,000-136,000	VU	▼		
Little gull	Hydrocoloeus minutus	97,000-270,000	LC	▲	Values given are for total population.	
Andean gull	Chroicocephalus serranus	100,000	LC	?	Total population is estimated to be 150,000 individuals. IUCN/BirdLife International place species in genus Larus.	
Brown-headed gull	Chroicocephalus brunnicephalus	100,000-200,000	LC	Steady	Values given are for total population. IUCN/BirdLife International place species in genus Larus.	
Greater sandplover	Anarhynchus leschenaultii	100,000-225,000	LC	▼	Total population is estimated to be 150,000-340,000 individuals. IUCN/BirdLife International places this species in genus Charadrius.	
Red-legged kittiwake	Rissa brevirostris	100,000-499,999	VU	▼	Best estimate for number of mature individuals is 279,600.	
South American snipe (Pantanal snipe)	Gallinago paraguaiae	100,000-499,999	LC	Steady	This estimate for mature individuals is tentative, given the expectation that former estimate of 25,000-100,000 individuals was large underestimate.	
Iceland gull	Larus glaucoides	100,000-499,999	LC	Steady	Values given are for total population.	
Grey-backed tern (Spectacled tern)	Onychoprion lunatus	100,000-1,000,000	LC	▼	Values given are for total population.	
Kittlitz's plover	Anarhychus pecuarius	101,000-217,000	LC	▼	Total population is estimated to be 151,000-325,000 individuals. IUCN/BirdLife International place species in genus Charadrius.	
Temminck's stint	Calidris temminckii	110,000-850,000	LC	?	Total population is estimated to be 165,000-1,255,000 individuals.	
Western gull	Larus occidentalis	115,500-118,500	LC	▲	Values given are for total population	
Forster's tern	Sterna forsteri	120,000	LC	▲	Value given is for total population.	
Least tern	Sternula antillarum	120,000	LC	▼	IUCN/BirdLife International do not provide a population estimate. Value reported comes from Partners in Flight Database.	
Spotted redshank	Tringa erythropus	121,000-233,000	LC	▼	Total population is estimated to be 182,000-350,000 individuals.	
Pallas's gull	Ichthyaetus ichthyaetus	125,000-1,100,000	LC	▲	Values given are for total population. IUCN/BirdLife International place this species in genus Larus.	
Purple sandpiper	Calidris maritima	136,000-191,000	LC	▼	Total population is estimated to be 204,000-287,000 individuals.	
Greater yellowlegs	Tringa melanoleuca	137,000-6,860,000	NT	▼		
Rock sandpiper	Calidris ptilocnemis	140,000-145,000	LC	▼		
Spectacled guillemot	Cepphus carbo	140,000-148,000	LC	▼	Values given are for total population.	
Collared pratincole	Glareola pratincola	145,000-389,000	LC	?	Total population is estimated to be 218,001-584,000 individuals.	
Inca tern	Larosterna inca	>150,000	NT	▼	Value given is for total populations.	
Black-winged pratincole	Glareola nordmanni	150,000-190,000	NT	▼		
Sooty gull	Ichthyaetus hemprichii	150,000-300,000	LC	▼	Values given are for total population. IUCN/BirdLife International place species in genus Larus.	
Short-billed dowitcher	Limnodromus griseus	150,000-320,000	VU	▼	Best estimate of number of mature individuals is 245,000.	
Greater crested tern	Thalasseus bergii	150,000-1,100,000	LC	Steady	Values given are for total population.	
Oriental plover	Anarhynchus veredus	153,000	LC	Steady	Total population is estimated to be 230,000 individuals. IUCN/BirdLife International places this species in genus Charadrius.	
Terek sandpiper	Xenus cinereus	173,000-313,000	LC	▼	Total population is estimated to be 260,000-470,000 individuals.	
Slender-billed gull	Chroicocephalus genei	180,000-230,000	LC	?	Total population is estimated to be 280,000-345,000 individuals. IUCN/BirdLife International place species in genus Larus.	
Common gull-billed tern (Gull-billed tern)	Gelochelidon nilotica	190,000	LC	▼	IUCN/BirdLife International do not provide a population estimate, citing recent split with G. macrotarsa. Value reported comes from Partners in Flight Database.	
Solitary sandpiper	Tringa solitaria	190,000	LC	?		
Little tern	Sternula albifrons	190,000-410,000	LC	▼	Values given are for total population.	
Roseate tern	Sterna dougallii	200,000-220,000	LC	?	Values given are for total population.	
Banded stilt	Cladorhynchus leucocephalus	200,000-300,000	LC	Steady	Total population is estimated to be 300,000-450,000 individuals.	
Great snipe	Gallinago media	200,000-380,000	NT	▼	Total population is estimated to be 310,000-570,000 individuals.	
Whiskered tern	Chlidonias hybrida	200,000-900,000	LC	?	Total population is estimated to be 300,000-1,400,000 individuals.	
Kentish plover	Anarhynchus alexandrinus	216,000-314,000	LC	▼	Total population is estimated to be 324,000-468,000 individuals. IUCN/BirdLife International place this species in genus Charadrius.	
Pigeon guillemot	Cepphus columba	235,000	LC	Steady	Value given is for total population.	
Mediterranean gull	Ichthyaetus melanocephalus	236,000-650,000	LC	▼	IUCN/BirdLife International place species in genus Larus.	
Marbled murrelet	Brachyramphus marmoratus	240,000-280,000	EN	▼	Total population is estimated to be 350,000-420,000 individuals.	
Willet	Tringa semipalmata	250,000	LC	▼		
Caspian tern	Hydroprogne caspia	250,000-470,000	LC	▲	Values given are for total population.	
Long-tailed jaeger	Stercorarius longicaudus	250,000-749,999	LC	Steady	Preliminary estimate for mature individuals.	
South American tern	Sterna hirundinacea	250,000-1,000,000	LC	▼	Values given are for total population.	
Great knot	Calidris tenuirostris	255,000-340,000	EN	▼	Total population is estimated to be 425,000 individuals.	
Bonaparte's gull	Chroicocephalus philadelphia	255,000-525,000	LC	▲	Values given are for total population. IUCN/BirdLife International place species in genus Larus.	
Marbled godwit	Limosa fedoa	270,000	VU	▼		
Pied avocet	Recurvirostra avosetta	280,000-470,000	LC	?	Values given are for total population.	
Crowned lapwing	Vanellus coronatus	293,000-717,000	LC	▼	Total population is estimated to be 440,001-1,075,000 individuals.	
Red-necked stint	Calidris ruficollis	310,000-360,000	NT	▼	Total population is estimated to be 475,000 individuals.	
Common ringed plover	Charadrius hiaticula	320,000-400,000	LC	Steady	Total population is estimated to be 80,000-600,000 individuals.	
Sandwich tern	Thalasseus sandvicensis	325,000-430,000	LC	Steady	Total population is estimated to be 490,000-640,000 individuals. Note that IOC taxonomy splits an additional species, Cabot's tern (T. acuflavidus) from this species, noting its closer relation to the elegant tern. IUCN/BirdLife International maintain Cabot's tern as a subspecies within T. sandvicensis.	
Marsh sandpiper	Tringa stagnatilis	331,000-502,000	LC	▼	Total population is estimated to be 497,000-753,000 individuals.	
Sabine's gull	Xema sabini	>340,000	LC	Steady	Value given is for total population.	
Heermann's gull	Larus heermanni	350,000	NT	?		
Eurasian thick-knee (Eurasian stone-curlew)	Burhinus oedicnemus	360,000-590,000	LC	▼	Preliminary estimate for mature individuals.	
Pomarine jaeger	Stercorarius pomarinus	400,000	LC	Steady	Preliminary estimate for mature individuals.	
White-cheeked tern	Sterna repressa	400,000	LC	▼	Total population is estimated to be 600,000.	
Tibetan sandplover	Anarhynchus atrifrons	400,000-480,000	LC	▼	IUCN/BirdLife International places this species in genus Charadrius.	
Arctic jaeger (Parasitic jaeger)	Stercorarius parasiticus	400,000-599,999	LC	Steady	Preliminary estimate for mature individuals.	
Bridled tern	Onychoprion anaethetus	400,000-1,000,000	LC	?	Total population is estimated to be 610,000-1,500,000 individuals.	
Black guillemot	Cepphus grylle	400,000-1,499,999	LC	?	Preliminary estimate for number of mature individuals.	
Glaucous gull	Larus hyperboreus	400,000-1,500,000	LC	Steady	Values given are for total population.	
Curlew sandpiper	Calidris ferruginea	420,000-960,000	VU	▼	Total population is estimated to be 700,000-1,200,000 individuals.	
Arctic herring gull (American herring gull)	Larus smithsonianus	430,000-520,000	LC	▼	Value given is for total population. Note that IOC taxonomy splits two additional species, the Vega gull (L.vegae) and Mongolian gull (L. mongolicus) from this species. IUCN/BirdLife International maintain all three species within L. smithsonianus.	
Black-tailed godwit	Limosa limosa	450,000-585,000	NT	▼	Total population is estimated to be 672,000-873,000 individuals.	
American avocet	Recurvirostra americana	460,000	LC	?		
Black-winged stilt	Himantopus himantopus	486,000-2,690,000	LC	Steady	Total population is estimated to be 729,100-4,039,100 individuals. Note that IOC taxonomy splits three additional species, the pied stilt (H. leucocephalus), black-necked stilt (H. mexicanus), and white-backed stilt (H. melanurus) from this species. IUCN/BirdLife International maintain all four species within H. himantopus.	
Black skimmer	Rynchops niger	500,000-999,999	LC	?	Best estimate for number of mature individuals is 800,000.	
Long-billed dowitcher	Limnodromus scolopaceus	500,000-1,000,000	NT	▼	Best estimate for number of mature individuals is 800,000.	
Semipalmated plover	Charadrius semipalmatus	500,000-1,000,000	LC	▼		
Double-striped thick-knee	Burhinus bistriatus	500,000-4,999,999	LC	Steady		
Northern jacana	Jacana spinosa	500,000-4,999,999	LC	?		
Little ringed plover	Charadrius dubius	503,000-863,000	LC	▼	Total population is estimated to be 755,001-1,295,000 individuals.	
Lesser yellowlegs	Tringa flavipes	527,000-7,600,000	VU	▼	Best estimate for number of mature individuals is 650,000.	
Glaucous-winged gull	Larus glaucescens	>570,000	LC	▲	Value is for total population.	
Eurasian oystercatcher	Haematopus ostralegus	616,667-686,667	NT	▼	Total population is estimated to be 925,000-1,030,000 individuals.	
California gull	Larus californicus	621,000	LC	▼	Value given is for total population.	
Spotted sandpiper	Actitis macularius	660,000	LC	Steady		
African jacana	Actophilornis africanus	667,000	LC	Steady	Total population is estimated to be 1.0 million individuals.	
Great black-backed gull	Larus marinus	690,000-940,000	LC	?	Values given are for total population.	
Jack snipe	Lymnocryptes minimus	707,000-1,490,000	LC	Steady	Total population is estimated to be 1,060,002-2,235,001 individuals.	
Common redshank	Tringa totanus	740,000-1,200,000	LC	▼	Total population is estimated to be 1,100,000-1,800,000 individuals.	
Upland sandpiper	Bartramia longicauda	750,000	LC	▲		
Ruddy turnstone	Arenaria interpres	750,000-1,750,000	NT	▼		
Bar-tailed godwit	Limosa lapponica	770,000-880,000	NT	▼	Total population is estimated to be 1.1 million individuals.	
Horned puffin	Fratercula corniculata	>800,000	LC	▼	Total population is estimated to be more than 1.2 million individuals.	
Brown noddy	Anous stolidus	800,000-1,400,000	LC	Steady	Total population is estimated to be 1.2-2.1 million individuals.	
Black tern	Chlidonias niger	800,000-1,750,000	LC	▼	Values given are for total population.	
Eurasian curlew	Numenius arquata	835,000-1,310,000	NT	▼	Values given are for total population.	
Razorbill	Alca torda	838,000-1,660,000	LC	▲	Total population is estimated to be 1,257,000–2,490,000 individuals.	
Common greenshank	Tringa nebularia	860,000-1,710,000	LC	Steady	Total population is estimated to be 1.29-2.57 million individuals.	
Sanderling	Calidris alba	900,000-1,200,000	LC	▼		
Lesser black-backed gull	Larus fuscus	940,000-2,070,000	LC	▲	Values given are for total population.	
Little stint	Calidris minuta	1,000,000-1,100,000	LC	▲	Total population is estimated to be 1.5-1.6 million individuals.	
Ancient murrelet	Synthliboramphus antiquus	1,000,000-2,000,000	LC	▼	Values given are for total population.	
Grey plover	Pluvialis squatarola	1,000,000-2,500,000	VU	▼		
Franklin's gull	Leucophaeus pipixcan	1,000,000-1,490,000	LC	▲	Values given are for total population. IUCN/BirdLife International place species in genus Larus.	
American golden plover	Pluvialis dominica	1,000,000-6,000,000	LC	▼	Total population is estimated to be 6.0 million individuals.	
European herring gull	Larus argentatus	1,060,000-1,220,000	LC	▼	Total population is estimated to be 1.59-1.83 million individuals.	
Black-tailed gull	Larus crassirostris	>1,100,000	LC	Steady	Value given is for total population.	
Lesser noddy	Anous tenuirostris	1,200,000	LC	Steady	Value given is the minimum estimate for total population.	
Stilt sandpiper	Calidris himantopus	1,200,000	NT	▼		
Baird's sandpiper	Calidris bairdii	1,200,000-1,500,000	LC	Steady		
Black noddy	Anous minutus	1,300,000	LC	▼		
Rhinoceros auklet	Cerorhinca monocerata	>1,300,000	LC	▼	Value given is for total population.	
Parakeet auklet	Aethia psittacula	1,400,000	LC	▼		
Wilson's phalarope	Steganopus tricolor	1,500,000	LC	Steady		
Laughing gull	Leucophaeus atricilla	1,600,000	LC	▲	IUCN/BirdLife International do not provide a population estimate. Value reported comes from Partners in Flight Database. IUCN/BirdLife International place species in genus Larus.	
Common tern	Sterna hirundo	1,600,000-3,600,000	LC	?	Values given are for total population.	
White-winged tern	Chlidonias leucopterus	1,700,000-3,000,000	LC	▼	Total population is estimated to be 2.6-4.5 million individuals.	
Whimbrel (Eurasian whimbrel)	Numenius phaeopus	1,800,000-2,650,000	LC	▼	Note that IOC taxonomy splits an additional species, the Hudsonian whimbrel (N. hudsonicus), from this species. IUCN/BirdLife International maintain both species within N. phaeopus.	
Green sandpiper	Tringa ochropus	1,830,000-3,200,000	LC	Steady	Total population is estimated to be 2.75-4.80 million individuals.	
Oriental pratincole	Glareola maldivarum	1,930,000-1,990,000	LC	Steady	Total population is estimated to be 2.89-2.98 million individuals.	
European golden plover	Pluvialis apricaria	1,970,000-2,910,000	LC	Steady	Total population is estimated to be 2.96-4.37 million individuals.	
Wilson's snipe	Gallinago delicata	2,000,000	LC	▲		
Arctic tern	Sterna paradisaea	>2,000,000	LC	▼	Value given is for total population.	
Red knot	Calidris canutus	2,000,000-3,000,000	NT	▼		
Killdeer	Charadrius vociferus	2,300,000	NT	▼		
Tufted puffin	Fratercula cirrhata	>2,300,000	LC	Steady	Total population is estimated to be more than 3.5 million individuals.	
Mew gull (Common gull)	Larus canus	2,500,000-3,700,000	LC	?	Values given are for toral population. Note that IOC taxonomy splits an additional species, the short-billed gull (L. brachyrhynchus), from this species. IUCN/BirdLife International maintain both species within L. canus.	
Ring-billed gull	Larus delawarensis	2,550,000	LC	▲	Value given is for total population.	
Ruff	Calidris pugnax	2,600,000-5,600,000	LC	▼	Total population is estimated to be 3.9-8.3 million individuals.	
Dunlin	Calidris alpina	3,000,000-7,000,000	NT	▼	Total population is estimated to be 5.96-7.61 million individuals.	
Wood sandpiper	Tringa glareola	3,020,000-4,620,000	LC	?	Total population is estimated to be 4.53-6.93 million individuals.	
Common sandpiper	Actitis hypoleucos	3,230,000-5,190,000	LC	Steady	Total population is estimated to be 4.84-7.79 million individuals.	
White-rumped sandpiper	Calidris fuscicollis	3,270,000-9,070,000	VU	▼	Best estimate for number of mature individuals is 6.2 million.	
Kelp gull	Larus dominicanus	3,300,000-4,300,000	LC	▲	Values given are for total population.	
Western sandpiper	Calidris mauri	3,500,000	LC	▼		
American woodcock	Scolopax minor	3,500,000	LC	▼		
Cassin's auklet	Ptychoramphus aleuticus	3,600,000	NT	▼	Total population is estimated to be 5.4 million individuals.	
Red-necked phalarope	Phalaropus lobatus	3,600,000-4,500,000	LC	▼	Values given are for total population.	
Pectoral sandpiper	Calidris melanotos	4,000,000-15,000,000	LC	?	Best estimate for number of mature individuals is 8 - 15 million.	
Northern lapwing	Vanellus vanellus	4,300,000-7,000,000	NT	▼	Total population is estimated to be 6.4-10.5 million individuals.	
Black-headed gull	Chroicocephalus ridibundus	4,800,000-8,900,000	LC	?	Values given are for total population. IUCN/BirdLife International place species in genus Larus.	
Least sandpiper	Calidris minutilla	5,000,000-15,000,000	NT	▼		
Wattled jacana	Jacana jacana	5,000,000-49,999,999	LC	Steady		
Southern lapwing	Vanellus chilensis	5,000,000-49,999,999	LC	▲		
Crested auklet	Aethia cristatella	>5,500,000	LC	▼	Total population is estimated to be more than 8.2 million individuals.	
Common snipe	Gallinago gallinago	7,000,000-11,000,000	LC	▼	Total population is estimated to be 10.5-16.9 million individuals.	
Semipalmated sandpiper	Calidris pusilla	9,000,000-11,000,000	NT	▼		
Red phalarope	Phalaropus fulicarius	9,000,000-12,000,000	LC	?		
Eurasian woodcock	Scolopax rusticola	11,000,000-16,000,000	LC	?	Total population is estimated to be 16.5-24.0 million individuals.	
Atlantic puffin	Fratercula arctica	12,000,000-14,000,000	VU	▼		
Black-legged kittiwake	Rissa tridactyla	14,600,000-15,700,000	VU	▼	Values given are for total population.	
Little auk	Alle alle	16,000,000-36,000,000	LC	▼	Values given are for total population.	
Common murre	Uria aalge	>18,000,000	LC	▲	Value given is for total population.	
Least auklet	Aethia pusilla	20,000,000	LC	▼		
Thick-billed murre	Uria lomvia	>22,000,000	LC	▲	Value given is for total population.	
Sooty tern	Onychoprion fuscatus	23,000,000	LC	?	Total population is estimated to be 35.0 million individuals.	

== Species without population estimates ==
Common name	Binomial name	Population	Status	Trend	Notes	Image
Luzon buttonquail	Turnix worcesteri	unknown	DD	?	No records of this species since 2009. Habitat has not been extensively searched; not even qualitative estimates are able to be made.	
Long-billed murrelet	Brachyramphus perdix	unknown	NT	▼	Population was estimated in 1995 to be "in the tens of thousands," and <100,000 breeding pairs are estimated to be in Russia. With no recent quantifications, total population is considered unknown.	
Indian courser	Cursorius coromandelicus	unknown	NT	▼		
Great thick-knee (Great stone-curlew)	Esacus recurvirostris	unknown	NT	▼		
Blue noddy	Anous ceruleus	unknown	LC	Steady	Combined total population of this species and grey noddy (A. albivitta) are 27,000-120,000 individuals.	
Grey noddy	Anous albivitta	unknown	LC	Steady	Combined total population of this species and blue noddy (A. ceruleus) are 27,000-120,000 individuals.	
Indian thick-knee (Indian stone-curlew)	Burhinus indicus	unknown	LC	?		
Snowy sheathbill	Chionis albus	unknown	LC	Steady		
Grey-headed gull	Chroicocephalus cirrocephalus	unknown	LC	Steady	IUCN/BirdLife International place species in genus Larus.	
Hartlaub's gull	Chroicocephalus hartlaubii	unknown	LC	▲	IUCN/BirdLife International place species in genus Larus.	
Brown-hooded gull	Chroicocephalus maculipennis	unknown	LC	▲	IUCN/BirdLife International place species in genus Larus.	
Silver gull	Chroicocephalus novaehollandiae	unknown	LC	▲	IUCN/BirdLife International place species in genus Larus.	
Cream-coloured courser	Cursorius cursor	unknown	LC	?	There are an estimated 80,000 mature individuals in Arabia, 1,300-1,600 in Europe. However, populations in large portions of species range in North Africa and Asia have not been adequately quantified.	
Swinhoe's snipe	Gallinago megala	unknown	LC	?		
Solitary snipe	Gallinago solitaria	unknown	LC	?		
Little white tern (White tern)	Gygis microrhyncha	unknown	LC	Steady	IUCN/BirdLife International split white tern into three species, Little, Atlantic, (G. alba), and Common (G. candida) white terns. IOC taxonomy maintains all three species within G. alba.	
Caspian gull	Larus cachinnans	unknown	LC	▲		
Yellow-legged gull	Larus michahellis	unknown	LC	▲		
Ibisbill	Ibidorhyncha struthersii	unknown	LC	?		
Comb-crested jacana	Irediparra gallinacea	unknown	LC	?		
Tawny-throated dotterel	Oreopholus ruficollis	unknown	LC	?	Best guess for total population size of subspecies O. r. ruficollis is ~10,000 individuals, but this may be an underestimate. No population estimates given for subspecies O. r. pallidus.	
Quail-plover	Ortyxelos meiffrenii	unknown	LC	?		
Bukidnon woodcock	Scolopax bukidnonensis	unknown	LC	?		
Sulawesi woodcock	Scolopax celebensis	unknown	LC	▼		
New Guinea woodcock	Scolopax rosenbergii	unknown	LC	Steady		
Black-naped tern	Sterna sumatrana	unknown	LC	?		
Antarctic tern	Sterna vittata	unknown	LC	?		
Saunders's tern	Sternula saundersi	unknown	LC	▼		
Lesser crested tern	Thalasseus bengalensis	unknown	LC	Steady		
Sumba buttonquail	Turnix everetti	unknown	LC	Steady		
Red-backed buttonquail	Turnix maculosus	unknown	LC	▼		
Black-rumped buttonquail	Turnix nanus	unknown	LC	▼		
Madagascar buttonquail	Turnix nigricollis	unknown	LC	Steady		
Spotted buttonquail	Turnix ocellatus	unknown	LC	?		
Red-chested buttonquail	Turnix pyrrhothorax	unknown	LC	▼		
Barred buttonquail	Turnix suscitator	unknown	LC	▲		
Common buttonquail	Turnix sylvaticus	unknown	LC	?		
Yellow-legged buttonquail	Turnix tankii	unknown	LC	Steady		
Painted buttonquail	Turnix varius	unknown	LC	▼		
Little buttonquail	Turnix velox	unknown	LC	▼		
Red-wattled lapwing	Vanellus indicus	unknown	LC	?		
Yellow-wattled lapwing	Vanellus malabaricus	unknown	LC	?		

== See also ==
- Lists of birds by population
- Lists of organisms by population
