= Gallinago kakuki =

Gallinago kakuki Temporal range: Late Quaternary

Scientific classification
- Kingdom: Animalia
- Phylum: Chordata
- Class: Aves
- Order: Charadriiformes
- Family: Scolopacidae
- Genus: Gallinago
- Species: †G. kakuki

Binomial name
- †Gallinago kakuki Steadman & Takano, 2016

Extinct species of bird

Gallinago kakuki is a prehistoric species of snipe in the family Scolopacidae that was once endemic to the West Indies. Fossils of this species are known from the Bahamas, Cuba, and Cayman Brac in the Cayman Islands.

Gallinago kakuki was a rather large species of snipe that was able to fly despite having slightly more reduced flight capabilities than its relatives. It shared more osteological similarities with the Old World species of snipe than those found in the New World; this is also the case for the Puerto Rican woodcock (Scolopax anthonyi) and Hispaniolan woodcock (Scolopax brachycarpa), indicating a possible inter-hemispherical relationship between terrestrial Caribbean scolopacids and their Old World counterparts. Currently, the only extant snipe from the West Indies is the Wilson's snipe (G. delicata), which is a migrant visitor to the region.
