= Dusky woodcock =

Dusky woodcock has been split into two species:

- Javan woodcock, Scolopax saturata
- New Guinea woodcock, Scolopax rosenbergii
