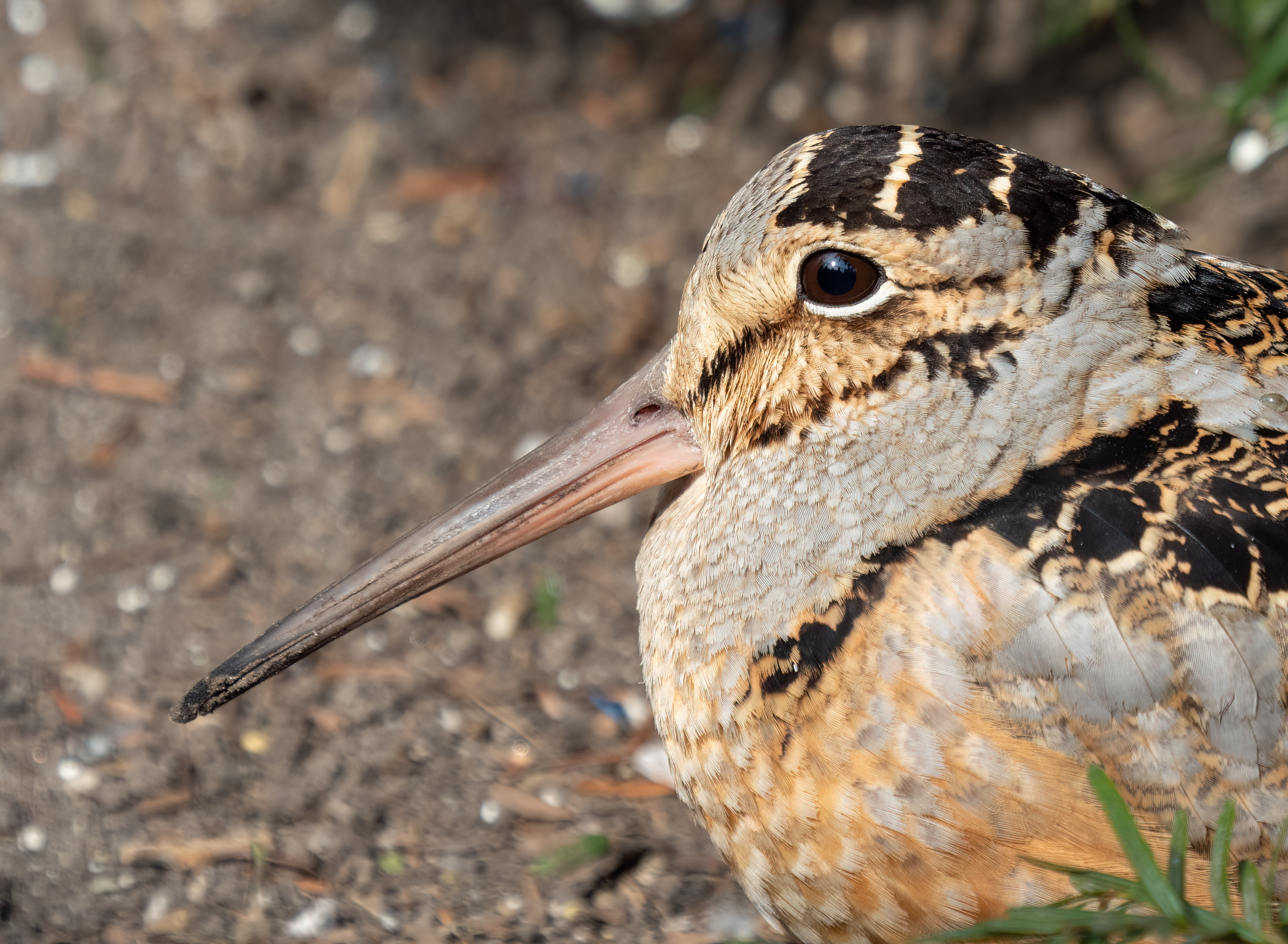
- American woodcock

Scientific classification
- Kingdom: Animalia
- Phylum: Chordata
- Class: Aves
- Order: Charadriiformes
- Family: Scolopacidae
- Genus: Scolopax; Linnaeus, 1758

Type species
- Scolopax rusticola Linnaeus, 1758

Diversity
- 8 living species

= Woodcock =

Genus of birds

The woodcocks are a group of eight very similar living species of sandpipers in the genus Scolopax. The genus name is Latin for a snipe or woodcock, and until around 1800 was used to refer to a variety of waders. The English name is first recorded in about 1050. According to the Harleian Miscellany, a group of woodcocks is called a "fall".

== Taxonomy ==
The genus Scolopax was introduced in 1758 by the Swedish naturalist Carl Linnaeus in the tenth edition of his Systema Naturae. The genus name is Latin for a snipe or woodcock. The type species is the Eurasian woodcock (Scolopax rusticola).

Only two woodcocks are widespread, the others being local island endemics. Most are found in the Northern Hemisphere but a few range into the Greater Sundas, Wallacea and New Guinea. The closest relative of the woodcocks is the jack snipe (Lymnocryptes minimus), with this genus pair then to the two other snipe genera Gallinago and Coenocorypha. As with many other sandpiper genera, the lineages that led to Gallinago and Scolopax likely diverged around the Eocene, some 55.8–33.9 million years ago, although the genus Scolopax is only known from the late Pliocene onwards.

Woodcock species are known to undergo rapid speciation in island chains, with the extant examples being the Amami woodcock in the Ryukyu Islands and the several species of woodcock in the Indonesian islands, the Philippines, and New Guinea. Subfossil evidence indicates the presence of another radiation of woodcock species in the Greater Antilles; these Caribbean woodcocks may have been more closely related to the Old World woodcock species than the New World ones, and were likely wiped out by human incursion into the region.

=== Species ===
The genus contains eight species:

- widespread species
  - American woodcock, Scolopax minor (large North American range)
  - Eurasian woodcock, Scolopax rusticola (large Eurasian range)
- local island endemic species
  - Amami woodcock, Scolopax mira (endemic to the Amami Islands in Japan)
  - Bukidnon woodcock, Scolopax bukidnonensis (endemic to Luzon and Mindanao in the Philippines)
  - Javan woodcock, Scolopax saturata (endemic to Sumatra and Java in Indonesia)
  - New Guinea woodcock, Scolopax rosenbergii (endemic to New Guinea)
  - Moluccan woodcock, Scolopax rochussenii (endemic to the Maluku Islands in Indonesia)
  - Sulawesi woodcock, Scolopax celebensis (endemic to Sulawesi in Indonesia)

=== Fossil record ===
A number of woodcocks are extinct and are known only from fossil or subfossil bones.

- "Scolopax baranensis" (fossil, Early Pliocene of Hungary; a nomen nudum)
- Scolopax carmesinae (fossil, Early/Middle Pliocene? of Menorca, Mediterranean)
- Scolopax hutchensi (fossil, Late Pliocene – Early Pleistocene of Florida, USA)
- Scolopax anthonyi (prehistoric, Holocene of Puerto Rico)
- Scolopax brachycarpa (subfossil, Holocene of Hispaniola)

== Description and ecology ==
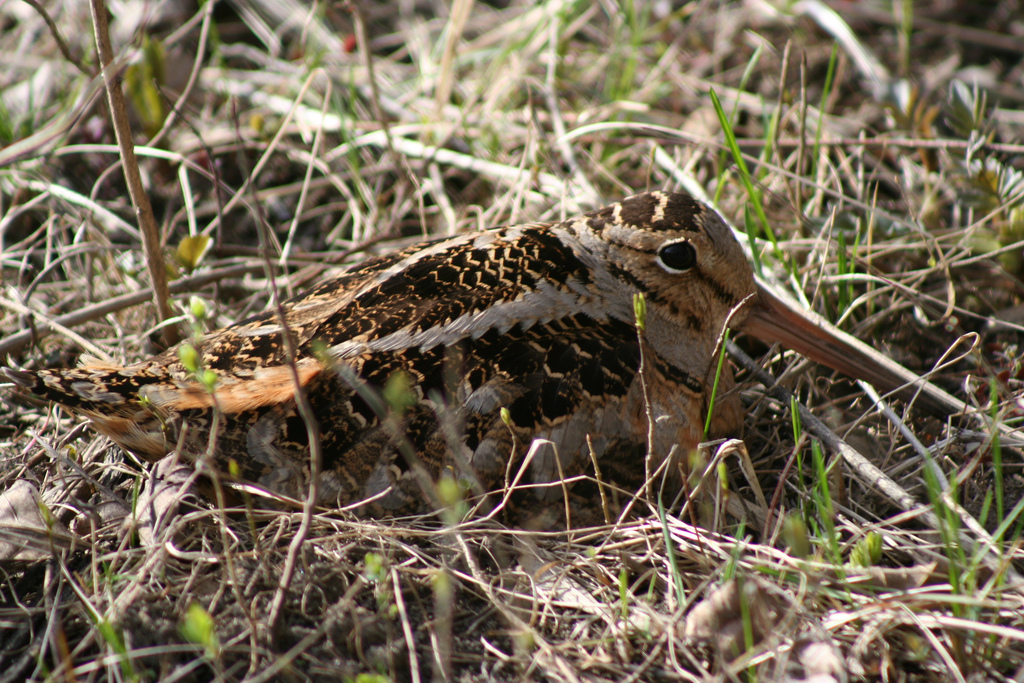
American woodcock

Woodcocks have stocky bodies, cryptic brown and blackish plumage, and long slender bills. Their eyes are located on the sides of their heads, which gives them 360° vision. Unlike in most birds, the tip of the bill's upper mandible is flexible.

As their common name implies, the woodcocks are woodland birds. They feed at night or in the evenings, searching for invertebrates in soft ground with their long bills. This habit and their unobtrusive plumage makes it difficult to see them when they are resting in the day. Most have distinctive displays known as "roding", usually given at dawn or dusk.

The range of breeding habits of the Eurasian woodcock extends from the west of Ireland eastwards across Europe and Asia preferring mostly boreal forest regions engulfing northern Japan, and also from the northern limits of the tree zone in Norway. Continuing south to the Pyrenees and the northern limits of Spain. Nests have been found in Corsica and there are three isolated Atlantic breeding stations in Azores, Madeira and the Canary Islands. In Asia the sites can be seen as far south as Kashmir and the Himalayas.

== Hunting ==
Some woodcocks have become popular gamebirds. The island-endemic species are often quite rare due to overhunting. The pin feathers (coverts of the leading primary feather of the wing) of the Eurasian woodcock are sometimes used by artists as brushtips for fine painting work.

The cocker spaniel dog breed is named after the bird: the dogs were originally bred to hunt the woodcock.
