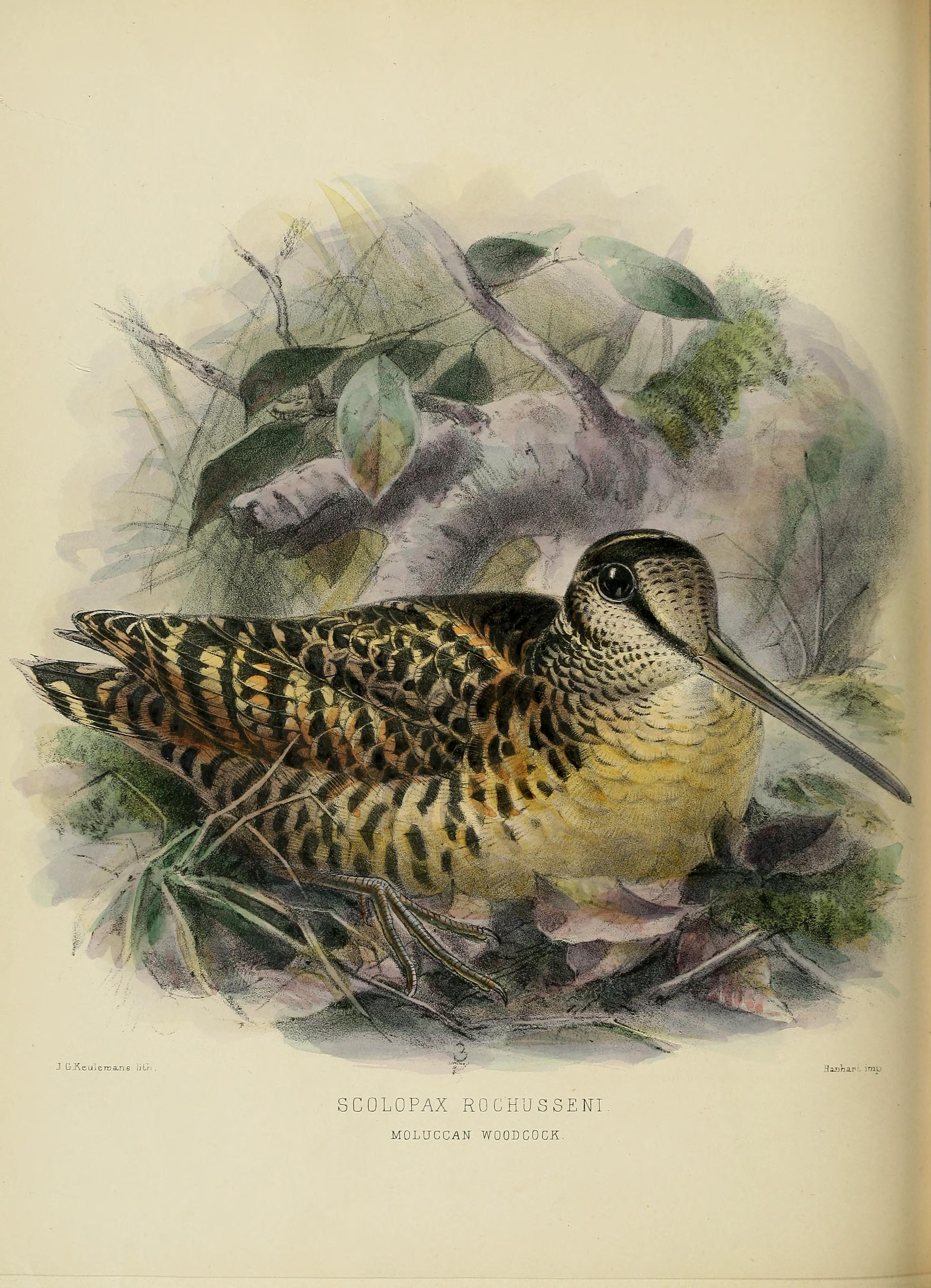
- Illustration of the Moluccan Woodcock

Conservation status
- Vulnerable (IUCN 3.1)

Scientific classification
- Kingdom: Animalia
- Phylum: Chordata
- Class: Aves
- Order: Charadriiformes
- Family: Scolopacidae
- Genus: Scolopax
- Species: S. rochussenii

Binomial name
- Scolopax rochussenii Schlegel, 1866

= Moluccan woodcock =

Species of bird

The Moluccan woodcock (Scolopax rochussenii), also known as the Obi woodcock, is a lowland wader endemic to Indonesia. Its distribution is restricted to Obi and possibly Bacan, two small islands in North Maluku. It is a medium-sized bird, measuring 32-40 centimetres, and is the largest of the woodcocks. Its conservation status is vulnerable due to severe habitat destruction on Obi.

== Description ==
The Moluccan woodcock measures 32-40 centimetres in length. Its body shape is stocky and compact, with a rounded, robust chest, wide pointed wings, and a short tail. The bill is long, straight, and dark. The upperside of the bird is black with light tan spots and sparse barring, while the underside is unstreaked and yellow-orange with slight black mottling. It has black bands between the eye and bill and on the back of the neck.

The Moluccan woodcock is larger than other members of the genus Scolopax. S. rochusseni resembles S. celebensis (Sulawesi woodcock) but is larger, lighter, and more spotted. Despite their similar appearance, it is unlikely that the range of S. rochusseni and S. celebensis would overlap.

== Taxonomy ==
The Moluccan woodcock is part of the sandpiper family Scolopacidae. Of the 15 genera in the sandpiper family, the Moluccan woodcock belongs to Scolopax, the woodcock genus. Scolopax includes eight species of woodcock, six of which are localized island endemic species, including the Moluccan woodcock. Within the Scolopacidae family, woodcocks are most closely related to snipes.

A Moluccan woodcock was collected for the first time in 1862 by Heinrich Bernstein and the species was later named Scolopax rochussenii in 1866 by Hermann Schlegel.

== Habitat and distribution ==
The Moluccan woodcock is a lowland species that prefers wet, coastal habitats in or close to forests. Their presence is closely associated with rivers and streams, and they occupy the same habitats year-round. Initially, the Moluccan woodcock was believed to be a montane bird, a habitat preference that would explain the lack of observations of the species. However, despite its occasional use of montane habitat, it is now considered more characteristic of lowland environments. Moluccan woodcocks fly anywhere between 15 and 1150 meters in elevation, but their population density is higher at lower altitudes. The species is tolerant of minor habitat destruction and has been found to occupy secondary forests affected by selective logging and small-scale agriculture. The estimated territory size for the Moluccan woodcock is 10.67 hectares.

Moluccan woodcocks are endemic to Indonesia. They have been found on Obi and Bacan, two small islands in the north of the Moluccas, an archipelago in eastern Indonesia. It is estimated that there are 9530 Moluccan woodcock territories on Obi. Only one individual has been recorded on Bacan in 1902, with most knowledge of the species coming from observations on Obi. It is unknown whether the species is still present on the island of Bacan.

== Behaviour ==
=== Display flights ===
Moluccan woodcocks are usually only ever observed during display behaviour. The purpose of this behaviour in the Moluccan woodcock is unclear, and very little is known about the species' behaviour when it is not performing a display flight. Display behaviour occurs during dusk or dawn during the wet season from March until August. It consists of rapid and shallow wingbeats with loud vocalizations, with no obvious flight pattern. The bird follows a river or stream, or circles over a swamp, maintaining an altitude of approximately 10 meters over the canopy.

=== Territorial conflicts ===
Moluccan woodcocks occasionally engage in territorial conflicts while performing a display flight. These encounters occur when two birds meet one another while participating in display behaviour. The conflict consists of a short flight where both individuals fly parallel to one another and do not overlap into the other's space. The birds communicate with a descending, twittering vocalization throughout the encounter.

=== Vocalizations ===
The Moluccan woodcock's vocalizations are described as hard, explosive, metallic rattles, transcribed as ''ti'ti'ti'ti'ti'ti'ti'ti''. Each trill lasts 0.1-0.6 seconds long and occur at intervals of 1.9-3.2 seconds. One trill contains 8-11 motifs, with each motif between 0.04 and 0.05 seconds long. The vocalizations are only known to occur during display flights.

== Documented sightings ==
A Moluccan woodcock was collected for the first time in 1862 by Heinrich Bernstein. From 1862 to 1982, only eight Moluccan woodcocks were recorded. Of these eight birds, seven were found on Obi and one was found on Bacan in 1902. From 1982 to 2013, there were no recordings of the Moluccan woodcock. The species seemingly disappeared until 2013 when a group of researchers rediscovered the bird and recorded its vocalizations for the first time. Today, the Moluccan woodcock is still not well understood and is considered to be an enigmatic species. Obi residents have limited knowledge of this bird and are unlikely to recognize it. Locals do not hunt or eat the species and therefore rarely have the opportunity to see Moluccan woodcocks up close.

== Threats and conservation status ==
The Moluccan woodcock is designated as vulnerable on the IUCN Red List of Threatened Species. While the species is tolerant of minor habitat destruction caused by selective logging and small-scale agriculture, the Moluccan woodcock still faces serious threats to its conservation. Severe habitat destruction caused by logging and mining activities on Obi is the major risk to the species' conservation, causing an overall decrease in population size. Unregulated large-scale nickel mining has led to the removal of all native vegetation and topsoil in some regions of western and southern Obi, causing dramatic modifications to the landscape and local bird populations. Moluccan woodcocks are not known to be hunted or trapped by locals on Obi.

The Moluccan woodcock was considered to be endangered from the years 2000 to 2021. In 2021, the species' designation was changed to vulnerable after having found that the species is more widespread on Obi than initially thought.

Conservation recommendations for the Moluccan woodcock include stricter mining regulations, the protection of lowland forests and rivers, and the establishment of a watershed management plan on Obi. Larger-scale sampling surveys are essential to better understand the distribution and population trend of the species and to better inform conservation management decisions.
