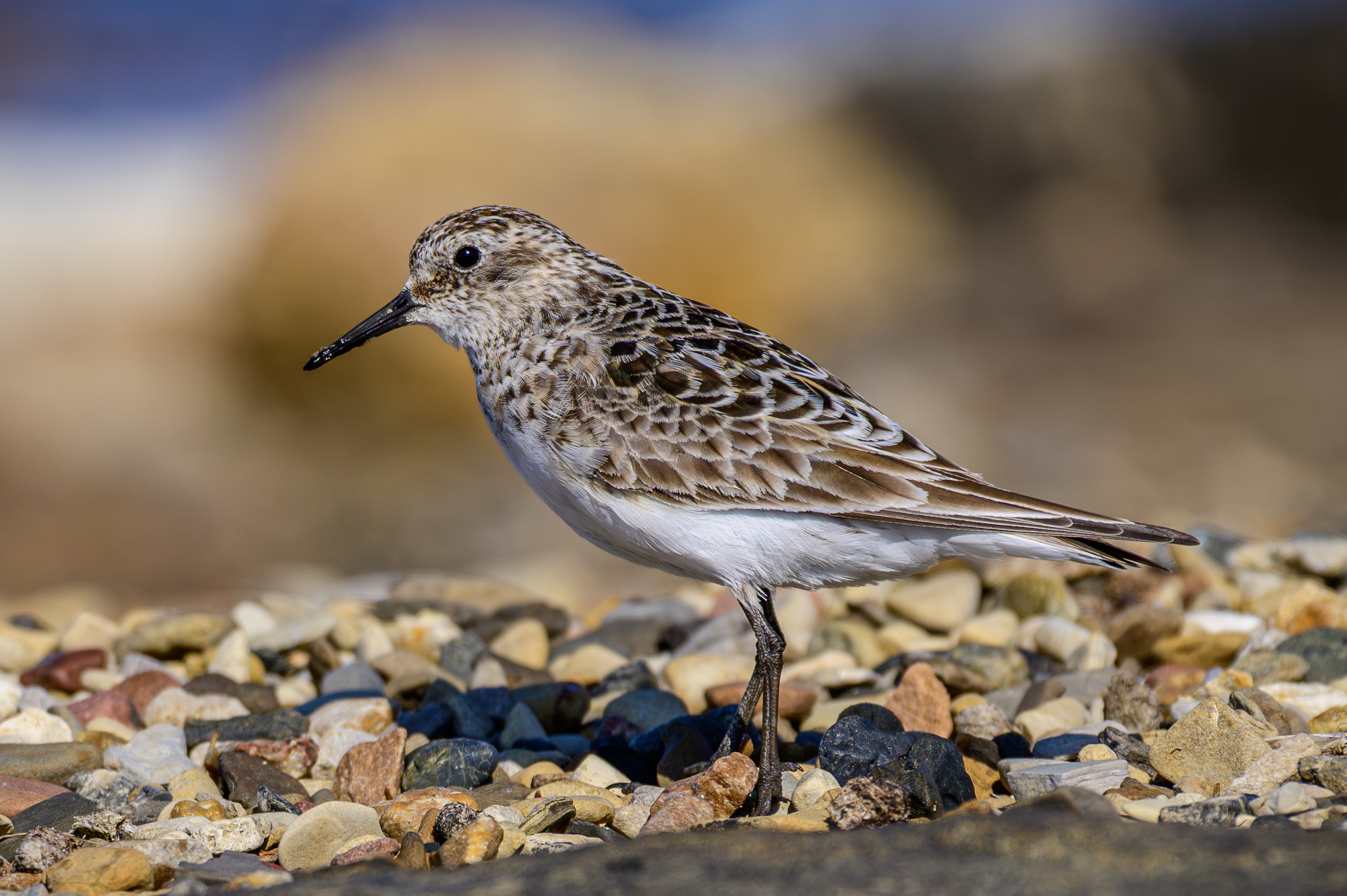
- Baird's sandpiper (Calidris bairdii)

Conservation status
- Least Concern (IUCN 3.1)

Scientific classification
- Kingdom: Animalia
- Phylum: Chordata
- Class: Aves
- Order: Charadriiformes
- Family: Scolopacidae
- Genus: Calidris
- Species: C. bairdii

Binomial name
- Calidris bairdii (Coues, 1861)
- Range Breeding Nonbreeding Passage

Synonyms
- Actodromus bairdii Erolia bairdii

= Baird's sandpiper =

Species of bird

Baird’s sandpiper (Calidris bairdii) is a small shorebird, weighing between 32-63 grams (1.1 - 1.2 ounces). It has mostly brown plumage with a white belly, straight black bill and short black legs. Depending on the time of year, they can be found across North or South America . They spend their summers breeding in the Arctic tundra, then migrate 9300 miles through central United states and the west coast of South America and winter on the southern tip of Argentina and Chile. Baird’s sandpiper can complete this incredible journey in as little as five weeks.

It is classified among the Calidris genus and within the Scolopacidae family. It was formerly included in the genus Erolia, which was subsumed into the genus Calidris in 1973. The genus name is from Ancient Greek kalidris or skalidris, a term used by Aristotle for some grey-coloured waterside birds. The English name and specific bairdii commemorate Spencer Fullerton Baird, 19th-century naturalist and assistant secretary of the Smithsonian Institution.

== Description ==
Adult Baird’s sandpipers are about the size of the American robin, weighing between 30-55g and have a length between 13-15cm. Male and females are nearly impossible to tell apart as both sexes are similar in size and plumage. Their plumage is a warm brown which sets them apart from other members of the Calidris genus which are more grey in colour. The head and chest of Baird's sandpiper are a lighter brown with dark streaks, and they have a light grey supercilium above the eye. The sandpiper has a white belly, dark brown rump and tail, short dark legs and a black bill that droops very slightly .

One of the best identification features are the long wings, which extend beyond the tail when the bird is on the ground. Only the white-rumped sandpiper also shows this feature, but it can be distinguished by its namesake white rump patch. The wings of the Baird's sandpiper are so long that the wingspan (30-40cm) more than doubles the length (14-17cm) of the bird.

Juvenile and adult plumages are very similar but do show some key distinctions. Juveniles display a buffy head (pale, warm yellowish-brown colour) and a scaly back. Juveniles also present a more pronounced and obvious supercilium when compared to the adult. There is no distinction between breeding and non-breeding adults.

Standard Measurements
length	14–17 cm (5.5–6.7 in)
wingspan	36–40 cm (14–16 in)
weight	32–63 g (1.1–2.2 oz)
wing	117.6–125.3 mm (4.63–4.93 in)
tail	50–57 mm (2.0–2.2 in)
culmen	20.5–24.5 mm (0.81–0.96 in)
tarsus	21.3–24.2 mm (0.84–0.95 in)

== Taxonomy ==
Baird’s sandpiper belongs to the genus Calidris which comprises 23 small to medium sized shorebird species with long wings and relatively short bills. These birds form large mixed flocks on coasts, breed in the Arctic and are long distance migrators. Calidris is one of many genera within the worldwide family of shorebirds, Scolopacidae.

Calidirine taxonomy has been difficult to define because sandpiper species are so closely related and have recently experienced rapid evolutionary diversification. Genetic similarities between Calidrines were assessed using mitochondrial DNA and it was discovered that Calidris could not be classified as a monophyletic group. Species that have been classified in other genera, particularly Eurynorchynchus and Limicola, were found to be genetically nested within the Calidris clade. Calidris has once again been recognized as a monophyletic group after having added these previously separate genera into it.

Within the birding community, there is an unofficial sub-genus of Calidris known by the term “peeps”. Peeps refer to a set of five Calidris species; least sandpiper, semipalmated sandpiper, western sandpiper, white rumped sandpiper and Baird's sandpiper. Peeps are notoriously difficult to distinguish due to their nearly identical appearance. These small shorebird display very similar brown and grey plumage, body size of roughly 1-ounce, short legs and white belly. The term peep is not recognized by the American Ornithological Society but can be a useful identification tool when a sandpiper cannot visually be identified in the field.

== Habitat and Distribution ==
Baird’s sandpiper occupies an extremely diverse range of habitat as it spreads its breeding, migration and wintering seasons over a vast area. These birds spend their summer breeding season in the high Arctic tundra across North America, Northwestern Greenland and the eastern tip of Siberia. Nesting in dry tundra habitat, Baird’s sandpiper prefer dry slopes with sparse alpine vegetation over the wet moist tundra lands that other shorebirds often select. They can also be found in rocky areas or exposed ridges.

Most shorebirds follow the coast during migration; however, the Baird’s sandpiper does not adhere to this trend. These birds fly through mid-continental North America, through Central America, down the coast of South America, all the way to the tip of the continent. Their path crosses over terrain such as the Canadian parries and grasslands of Interior United States as well as the Andes mountains that span from Venezuela to the tip of Argentina. Migrants enjoy quick rest stops in a wide variety of landscapes including, freshwater wetlands, lake and river edges, flooded grasslands and mudflats, a stark contrast from their dry breeding grounds. When migrating through tropical areas, Baird’s sandpiper utilizes marshes, lagoons, beaches and estuaries.

Baird’s sandpiper spends the winter, non-breading season, in the southern tip of South America, Patagonia, encompassed by Chile and Argentina. Here, the bird mostly occupies inland wetlands near the Andes mountains and marine, coastal ecosystems along the Atlantic coast.

== Behaviour ==
=== Vocalization ===
Similar to other Calidridines, Baird’s sandpiper utters four identifiable classes of calls: rhythmically repeated calls, song, chatter and laughs. Unpaired males perform rhythmically repeated calls when attempting to claim and display future nesting grounds. Songs, which are more punctuated than calls, are used to attract another bird's attention during breeding season. Chatter vocalization is always used to terminate a song sequence. Baird’s sandpiper also produces a laugh vocalization which is distinct from the other classes, but it is unclear what purpose this behaviour has.

=== Diet ===
Baird’s Sandpiper is an opportunistic generalist and consumes a broad range of food from its diverse habitats. During migration and wintering, Baird’s sandpiper utilizes flexible foraging methods that allow them to take advantage of whatever aquatic or terrestrial environment they stop over in. They forage by walking and visually searching for prey, pecking at the surface to ingest small invertebrates. In the summer, during their time in the Arctic, these birds prefer dry tundra to peck prey off the surface.

Stomach contents of Baird's sandpiper have been found to include over 25 different food items including: insects, seeds, molluscs and crustaceans . The slender, straight shape of their bill is ideal for surface foraging as opposed to a longer, curved bill that some other calidrines feature that allow them to reach deeper into the ground where prey burrow .

=== Reproduction ===
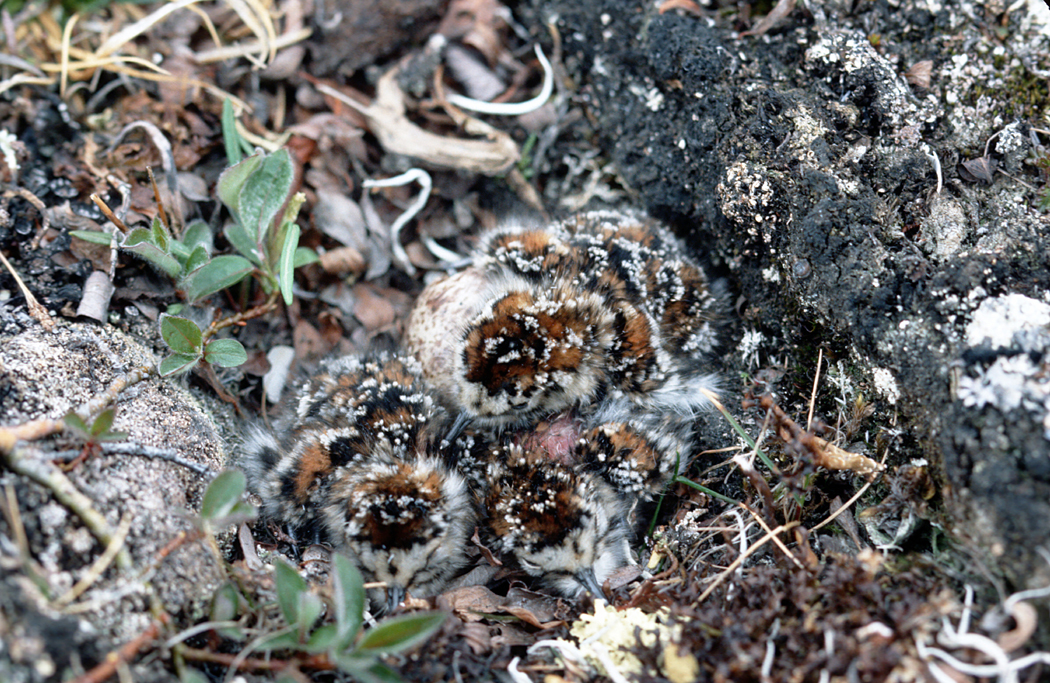
Chicks on the ground, camouflaged

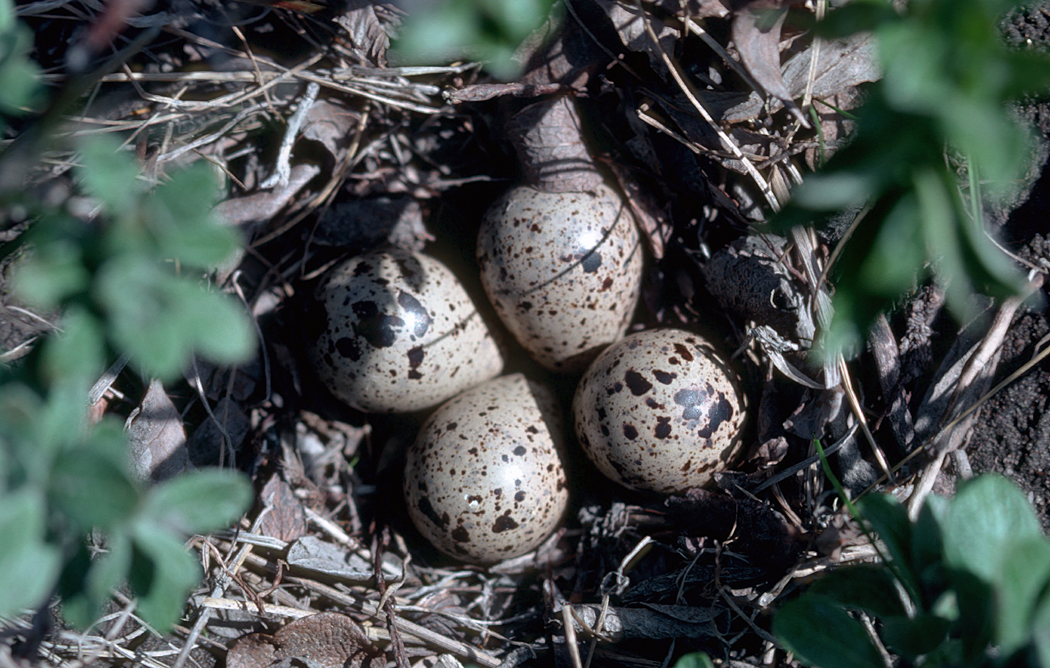
Eggs in a nest

Males are the first to arrive to the breeding grounds when snow is still abundant in the tundra. They claim their territory by preforming rhythmically repeated calls. Many males display their calls near one another upon arrival and as the snow melts, they spread out into areas that will serve for nesting. Males have also been known to chase each other out of nesting territory. The nest is placed on dry ground in the tundra near rocks or low, shrubby vegetation.

Males begin their mating performance by flying over 100 ft in the air, then descending to a low hover. During the hover, he produces a song to attract females, once she appears, the male lands and finishes his song with the chatter vocalization. On the ground, the male rushes at the female with back feathers and tail raised .

Both males and females collaborate when making the nest, incubating eggs and tending to the young. The parents scrape the ground with their feet and line the area with plant matter such as birch, willow, blueberry leaves and lichen. Females depart the breeding territory early for fall migration and leave males to finish raising the young.
