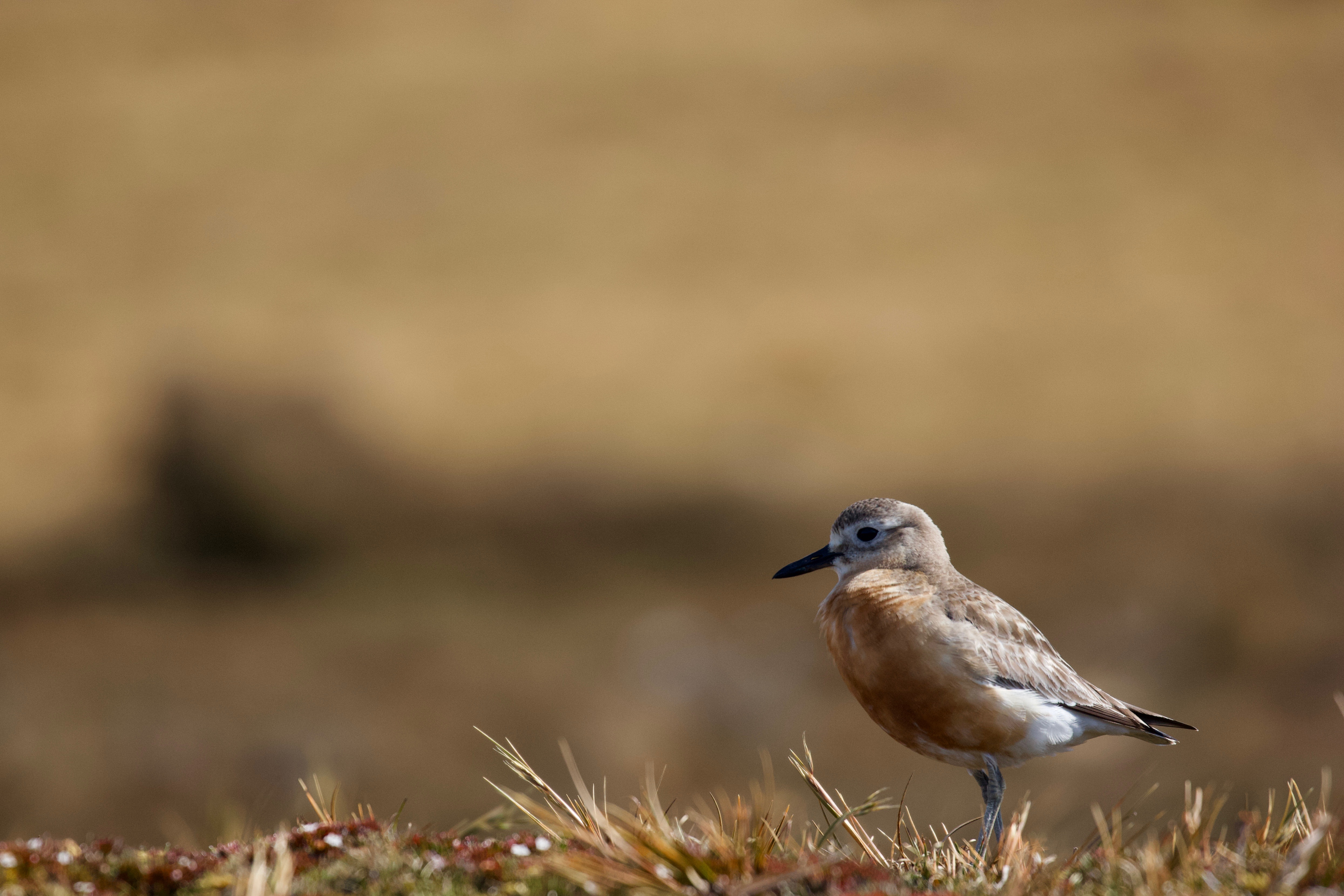
- Southern New Zealand dotterel on its breeding grounds on hills of Tin Range in Stewart Island

Conservation status
- Critically Endangered (IUCN 3.1)

- Nationally Critical (NZ TCS)

Scientific classification
- Kingdom: Animalia
- Phylum: Chordata
- Class: Aves
- Order: Charadriiformes
- Family: Charadriidae
- Genus: Charadrius
- Species: C. obscurus
- Subspecies: C. o. obscurus

Trinomial name
- Charadrius obscurus obscurus Gmelin, 1789

= Southern New Zealand dotterel =

Bird species of New Zealand

The southern New Zealand dotterel or southern red-breasted plover (Charadrius obscurus obscurus) is a critically endangered subspecies of the New Zealand dotterel, a shorebird endemic to New Zealand. The subspecies was once widespread across the South Island, but now breeds almost exclusively on Stewart Island.

== Taxonomy ==
The southern New Zealand dotterel and its fellow subspecies, the northern New Zealand dotterel, were traditionally lumped together into one species under the name New Zealand dotterel. However, studies have shown that there are significant morphological differences to justify the separation of these two subspecies, with the southern subspecies being far bulkier. Not only that, but different environments on the South Island may have given rise to different features, such as stronger winds necessitating a longer middle toe and claw. There are also significant differences in behavior, with the northern New Zealand dotterel preferring sandy beaches, while the southern New Zealand dotterel prefers inland nest sites, wintering on the South Island's beaches. In 2014, this subspecies was split by some taxonomic authorities.

== Distribution and habitat ==
While it was formerly found throughout the South Island, it is currently restricted to Stewart Island, where it breeds on inland mountain tops, plains, inland wetlands, marine intertidal, and river valleys. They have an upper elevation limit of 1,000 meters (3280.84 feet).

== Status ==
The southern New Zealand dotterel is categorized as critically endangered as its population is decreasing and is severely fragmented with 60 to 80 matured individuals left. It has largely died out in the South Island due to introduced predators such as feral cats and stoats. The total population dropped to 62 in 1992, before recovering to 290 birds in 2010. It has since declined to around 126 individuals, as of April 2023. The decline is not due to a lack of recruitment, but rather the death of mature birds, with predation by feral cats a major factor. An estimated 40–50 birds died during the 2022–2023 breeding season. Normal lifespan is about 20 years, but currently about 80 per cent die within 5 years.
