= New Guinea woodcock =

Conservation status
- Least Concern (IUCN 3.1)

Scientific classification
- Kingdom: Animalia
- Phylum: Chordata
- Class: Aves
- Order: Charadriiformes
- Family: Scolopacidae
- Genus: Scolopax
- Species: S. rosenbergii

Binomial name
- Scolopax rosenbergii Schlegel, 1871

Species of bird

The New Guinea woodcock (Scolopax rosenbergii) is a species of bird in the family Scolopacidae formerly considered to be conspecific with the Javan woodcock and called collectively the dusky woodcock. It is native to the New Guinea Highlands.
