= Scolopax brachycarpa =

Scolopax brachycarpa Temporal range: Late Holocene

Scientific classification
- Kingdom: Animalia
- Phylum: Chordata
- Class: Aves
- Order: Charadriiformes
- Family: Scolopacidae
- Genus: Scolopax
- Species: †S. brachycarpa

Binomial name
- †Scolopax brachycarpa Steadman & Takano, 2015

Extinct species of bird

Scolopax brachycarpa, is an extinct species of woodcock in the family Scolopacidae that was endemic to the Caribbean island of Hispaniola.

== Taxonomy ==
It belonged to an insular radiation of woodcocks that may have once existed throughout the Greater Antilles; another extinct member of this radiation is Scolopax anthonyi from Puerto Rico. Both birds shared more osteological characteristics with the Eurasian woodcock (S. rusticola) than the American woodcock (S. minor).

== History and extinction date ==
It was described from Trouing Jean Paul, a late Holocene limestone cave in Haiti, and was the fourth most common species in the fossil assemblage collected from it. The fossils collected date to between 650 and 1600 years ago, which is over 5 millennia after the first Paleo-Indian presence on Hispaniola. Thus, S. brachycarpa may have survived the Amerindian colonization of Hispaniola and possibly even into the European colonization of the island, as scientific knowledge of the island's avifauna did not rigorously start until the 19th century, at which point S. brachycarpa may have been already wiped out by invasive species, such as cats, dogs, and mongooses.
