= Scolopax anthonyi =

Scolopax anthonyi Temporal range: Late Quaternary

Scientific classification
- Kingdom: Animalia
- Phylum: Chordata
- Class: Aves
- Order: Charadriiformes
- Family: Scolopacidae
- Genus: Scolopax
- Species: †S. anthonyi

Binomial name
- †Scolopax anthonyi (Wetmore, 1920)

Synonyms
- Gallinago anthonyi (Wetmore, 1920) Scolopax anthonyi (Olson, 1976)

Extinct species of bird

Scolopax anthonyi is a prehistoric species of woodcock in the family Scolopacidae that was once endemic to the Caribbean island of Puerto Rico.

== Taxonomy ==
Its fossil remains were initially identified as belonging to a snipe of the genus Gallinago, but a re-analysis of the bones in 1976 indicated that they belonged to a woodcock. It has more osteological similarities to the Eurasian woodcock than the American woodcock, a trait it shares with the also extinct Scolopax brachycarpa of Hispaniola. Both of these species may have belonged to a distinct insular radiation in the Caribbean, which are now extinct.

== Description ==
Scolopax anthonyi had reduced wings compared to other species in the genus, indicating that it may have had a more terrestrial lifestyle or even may have been flightless. It likely lived in a forested habitat, like extant members of the genus. Little is known about the cause for its extinction.
