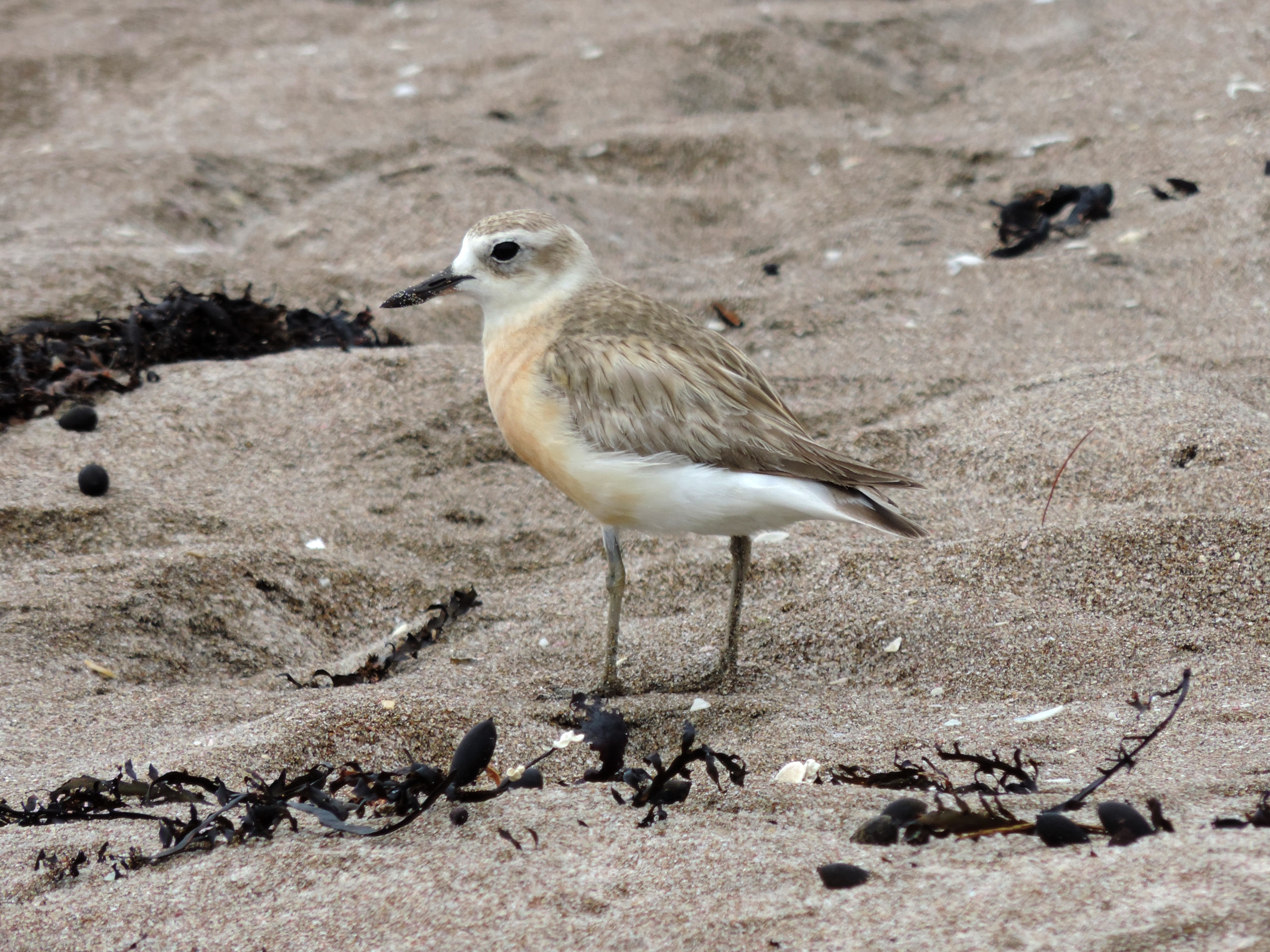

Conservation status
- Critically Endangered (IUCN 3.1) Southern population

- Least Concern (IUCN 3.1) Northern population

Scientific classification
- Kingdom: Animalia
- Phylum: Chordata
- Class: Aves
- Order: Charadriiformes
- Family: Charadriidae
- Genus: Anarhynchus
- Species: A. obscurus

Binomial name
- Anarhynchus obscurus (Gmelin, JF, 1789)

Audio
- Recording of a New Zealand dotterel

= New Zealand dotterel =

Species of bird

The New Zealand dotterel (Anarhynchus obscurus, synonym: Charadrius obscurus) is a species of shorebird found only in certain areas of New Zealand. It is also called the New Zealand plover or red-breasted plover, and its Māori names include tūturiwhatu, pukunui, and kūkuruatu.

There are two subspecies. The southern subspecies is critically endangered and was nearing extinction with about 70 individuals remaining in 1992. Conservation measures increased this nearly 300 by 2010, but a further decline has occurred to an estimated 101 individuals in 2024.

== Taxonomy and systematics ==
The New Zealand plover was formally described in 1789 by the German naturalist Johann Friedrich Gmelin in his revised and expanded edition of Carl Linnaeus's Systema Naturae. He placed it with the plovers in the genus Charadrius and coined the binomial name Charadrius obscurus. Gmelin's description was based on the "Dusky plover" that had been described in 1785 by the English ornithologist John Latham in his A General Synopsis of Birds. The species had been collected in April 1773 on James Cook's second voyage to the South Pacific at Dusky Sound, South Island, New Zealand. The specific epithet obscurus is Latin meaning "dark" or "dusky".

A 2015 study determined that its closest relatives are two other New Zealand plovers, the wrybill, which was found to be in the Charadrius clade, and the double-banded plover.

Two subspecies are recognised, although a taxonomic review has supported recognition of tentative species status for each of the two populations and this was recognised in the Handbook of the Birds of the World (BirdLife, 2014) and in the conservation listing of the IUCN.

- A. o. aquilonius (Dowding, 1994) – North Island
- A. o. obscurus (Gmelin, JF, 1789) – found on Stewart Island and southern South Island

== Description ==
It is a large, bulky plover, with a total length of 26–28 cm (10–11 in). The southern population is heavier, weighing 162 g (5.7 oz) on average compared to the northern 144 g (5.1 oz).

== Distribution and habitat ==
New Zealand plover are usually found in two disjunct populations in New Zealand, usually on sandy beaches and sand spits or feeding in tidal estuaries. The northern population occurs on the North Island and the southern population occurs at the southern end of the South Island and on Stewart Island/Rakiura.

== Behaviour and ecology ==
=== Breeding ===
Parents lay eggs in the spring and summer. They nest on beaches above the high tide mark, and the nest is just a shallow hole dug in the ground. Parents typically lay 2-3 eggs and are replaced if lost. These eggs measure 41.3–49.7 mm (1.63–1.96 in) in length and 31.4–34.2 mm (1.24–1.35 in) in width, weighing 18.1–26.5 g (0.64–0.93 oz) (across both species). The chicks hatch about 28 days after the eggs have been laid. Because the nests are on the ground, the chicks can walk the day they hatch. They are cared for by their parents but have to find their own food as the adults do not feed them. Parents will often go to great lengths to protect their chicks, as sometimes the parent will pretend to be injured to let the chicks escape, or usher chicks into grass or holes when threatened. They can usually fly within 6–8 weeks.

=== Diet ===
New Zealand plovers feed on small sand hoppers and insects, however they will sometimes feed on small aquatic creatures like small fish and crabs.

== Status ==
The IUCN, which treats the two subspecies as separate species, formerly rated the northern subspecies as Near Threatened, but this improved to Least Concern by 2022; and the southern subspecies as Critically Endangered.

The population size of the southerly subspecies had been reduced to about 62 individual birds in 1990 and the first study of the population structure undertaken from 1988 to 1992 indicated their significant decline. Conservation measures were put in place involving the poisoning of feral cats and rats and the population has gradually risen, with about 250 individuals being recorded in 2005. The northerly subspecies has a wider range and its population was about 1300 in 1989. It had recovered to about 1700 individuals by 2004 but only as a result of intensive management. Nesting on beaches, they are vulnerable to disturbance by people and their dogs. Since 2012, there has been a rapid decline in numbers in the southern population, with an estimated 60 to 80 mature individuals in 2017.

The northern subspecies has the conservation status of "Regionally Critical" in the Wellington Region.

In the Hawke's Bay region, the species was locally extinct from the late 19th century. However, in 1990 some birds were seen at the Mahia Peninsula. Coastline surveys conducted in 2011 and 2021 found that numbers in the region had more than doubled over the ten year period, with 222 birds counted in 2021.

== Gallery ==
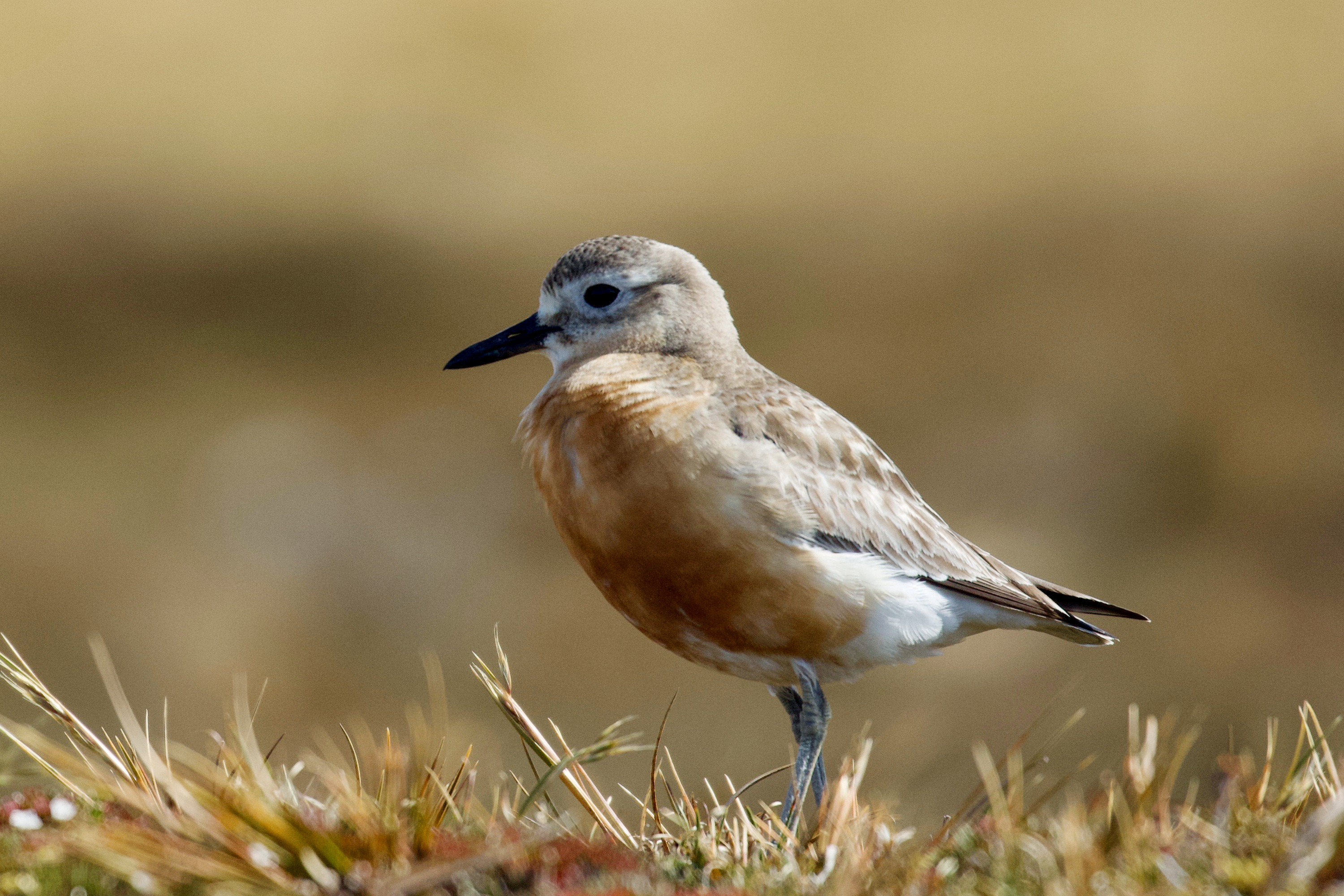
the ruddier and critically endangered nominate subspecies

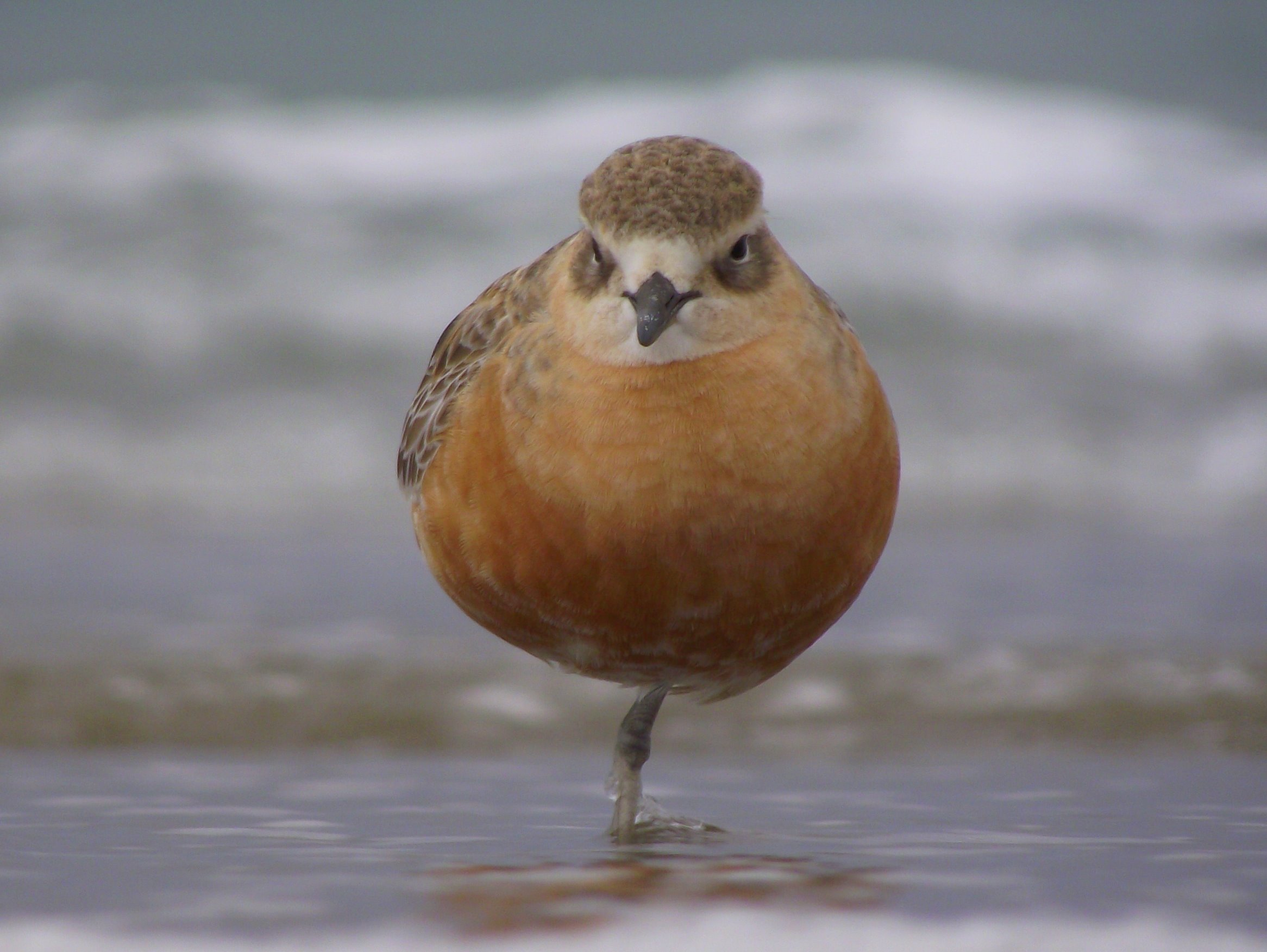
Mature male

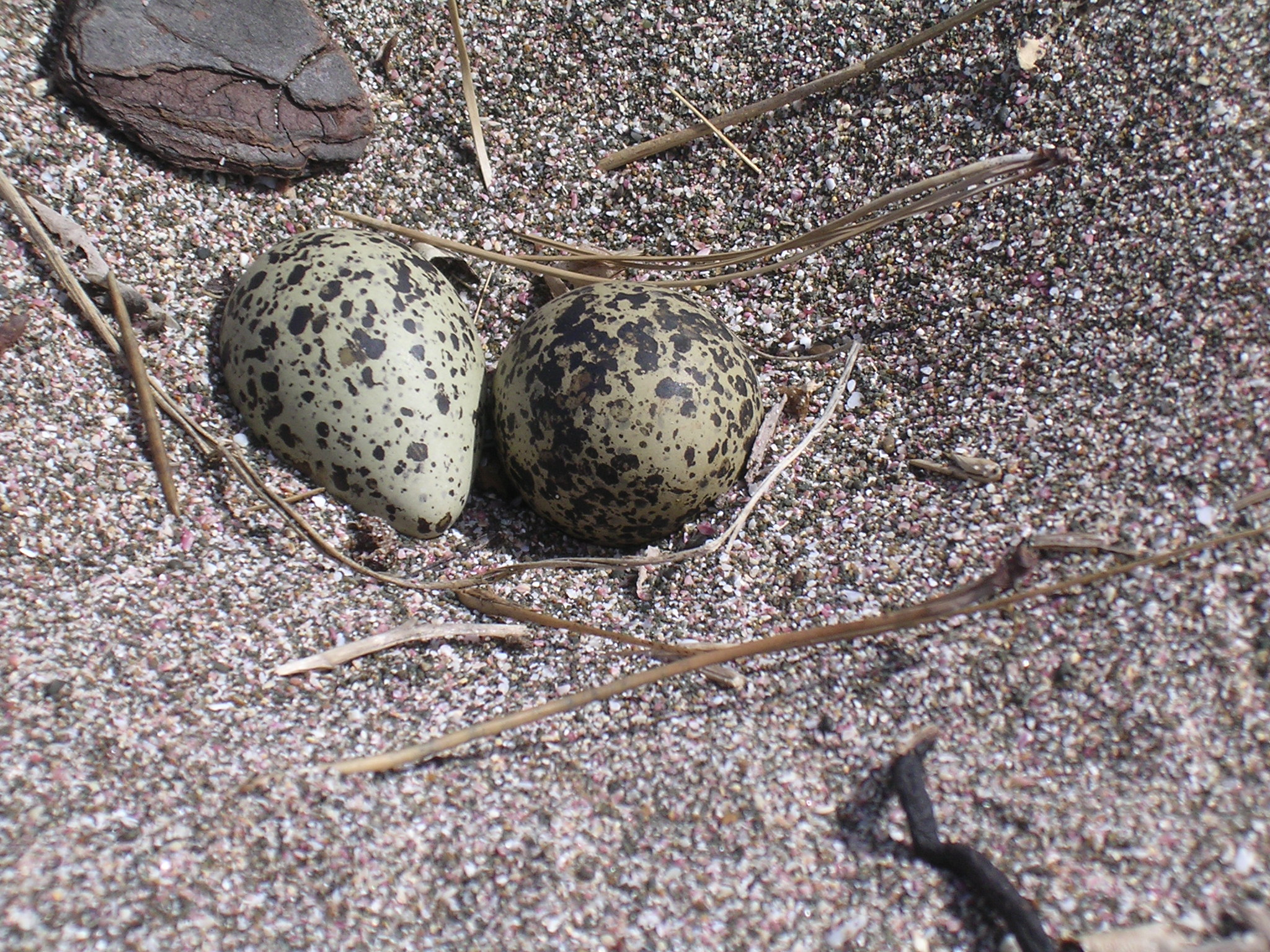
Eggs

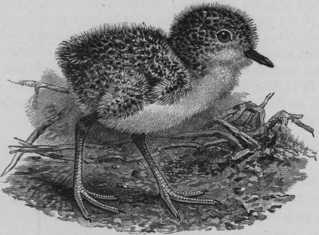
Illustration of chick

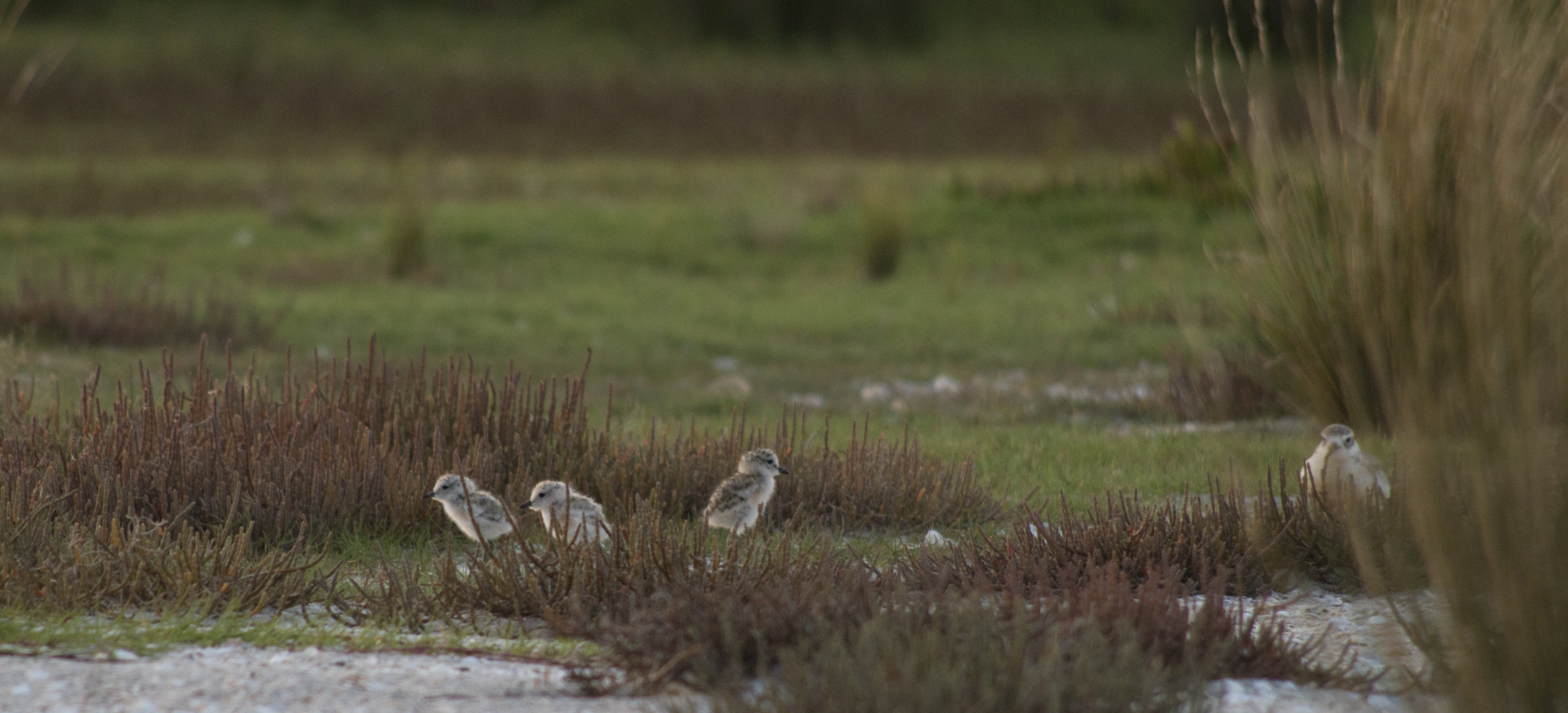

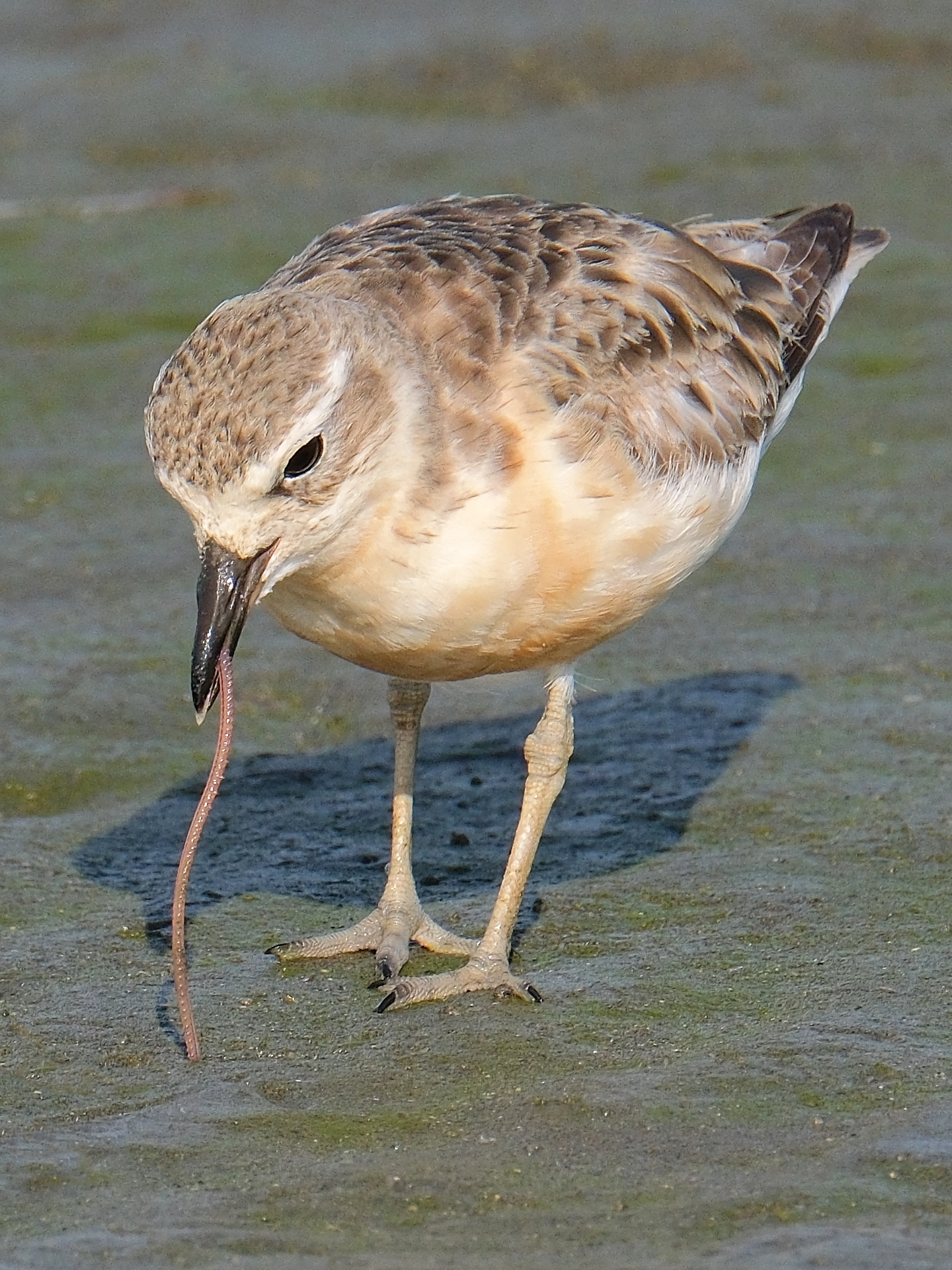
Pulling a worm out of the sand at Waikanae Beach
