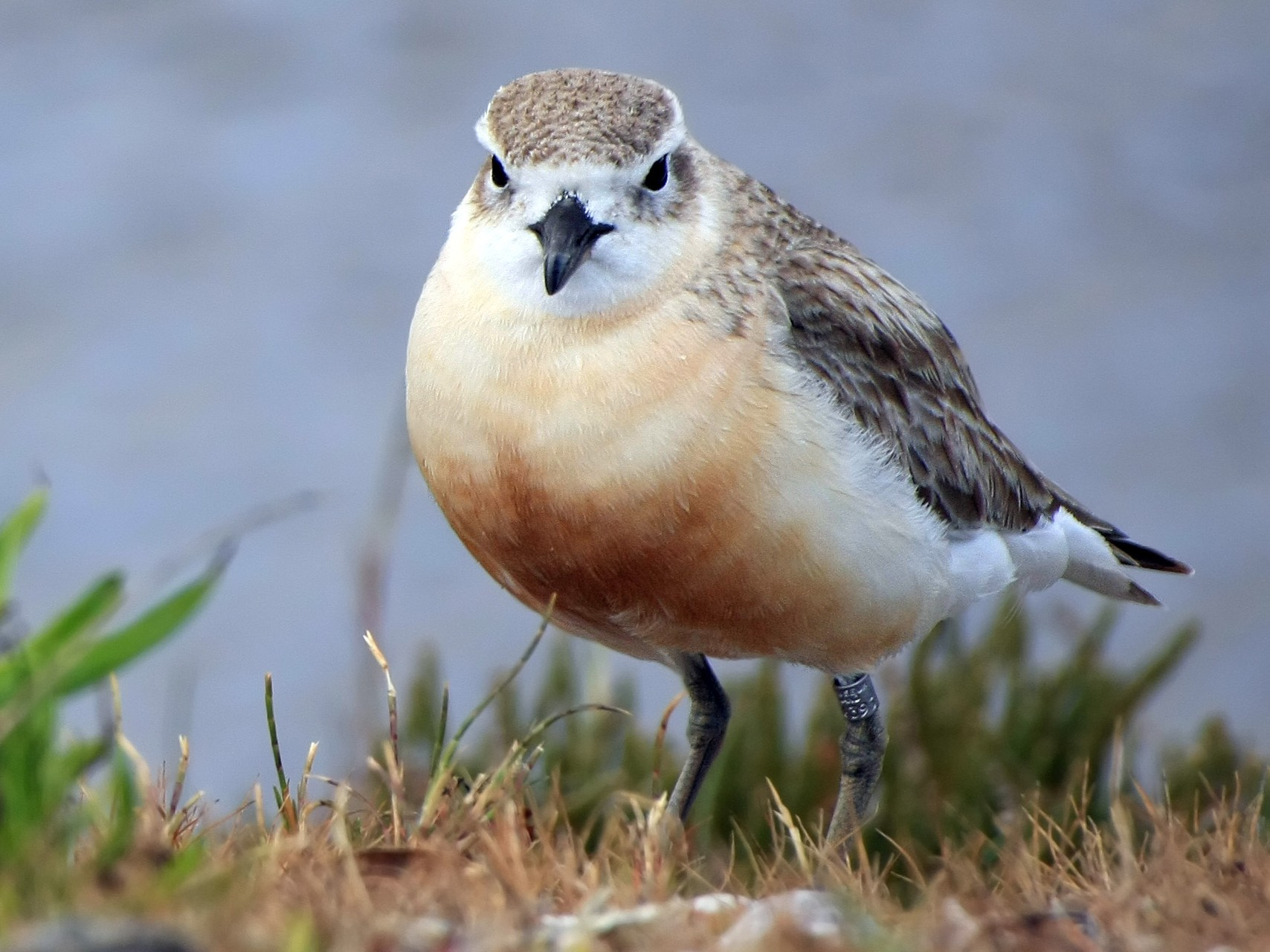

Conservation status
- Least Concern (IUCN 3.1)

- Nationally Increasing (NZ TCS)

Scientific classification
- Kingdom: Animalia
- Phylum: Chordata
- Class: Aves
- Order: Charadriiformes
- Family: Charadriidae
- Genus: Anarhynchus
- Species: A. obscurus
- Subspecies: A. o. aquilonius

Trinomial name
- Anarhynchus obscurus aquilonius Dowding, 1994

= Northern New Zealand dotterel =

Subspecies of bird

The northern New Zealand dotterel or northern red-breasted plover (Anarhynchus obscurus aquilonius) is a shorebird which breeds exclusively on beaches in New Zealand's North Island.

== Taxonomy ==
First described in 1994 as a subspecies, the holotype was selected from a collection made at Māngere near the Auckland Airport in October 1967; the adult male specimen is held at the Auckland Institute and Museum. The taxon has been classified as a subspecies, Charadrius obscurus aquilonius by authorities such as the Clements Checklist of Birds of the World and the International Ornithologists' Union, and tentatively recognised as a species in the Handbook of the Birds of the World (BirdLife, 2014).

The epithet aquilonius is derived from the Latin term for the north wind, aquilo, and is a reference to the northerly distribution of that distinguished the new taxon. The vernacular "Northern New Zealand Dotterel" was provided by J. E. Dowding when separating the taxon from those found at the South Island as a subspecies of Charadrius obscurus.

== Description ==
A bird in Charadrius, a genus of the wading birds known as plovers. The average length is 25 centimetres (9.8 in), the largest of the genus. The pale edged plumage at the upper side is predominantly brown, the pale or whitish ventral side is distinctly tinged with red during the breeding period. The male presents a red colour at the breast in all seasons. The legs are a midtone or pale grey, the bill is black and the iris is a dark brown colour.

The voice given in territorial displays, an extended "churring" sound, is loud and the most commonly heard.

== Distribution and habitat ==
A New Zealand endemic, which mainly breeds on the eastern coast of the North Island. Smaller nesting groups are found at the western coast.

== Status ==
Introduced species pose the greatest threat to the northern New Zealand dotterel. Predation, particularly by introduced cats, stoats, and hedgehogs, were responsible for the loss of 60% of nests in unmanaged areas. Recreational development, pesticide poisoning, invasion by noxious weeds, and storms pose additional threats. However, the population has been rising markedly due to conservation actions, reaching 1600 individuals in 2016. A survey following the use of brodifacoum, aerially broadcast as pellets to control pests species of rats and possums at the Tawharanui Regional Park, found the disappearance or death of half the local population followed the poisoning program. A link was found in the accumulation of the toxin in species of Talorchestia, small insects known as sandhoppers that are consumed by this plover, and analysis of a liver from a deceased specimen showed a high level of brodifacoum.

The IUCN classifies it as Least concern.
