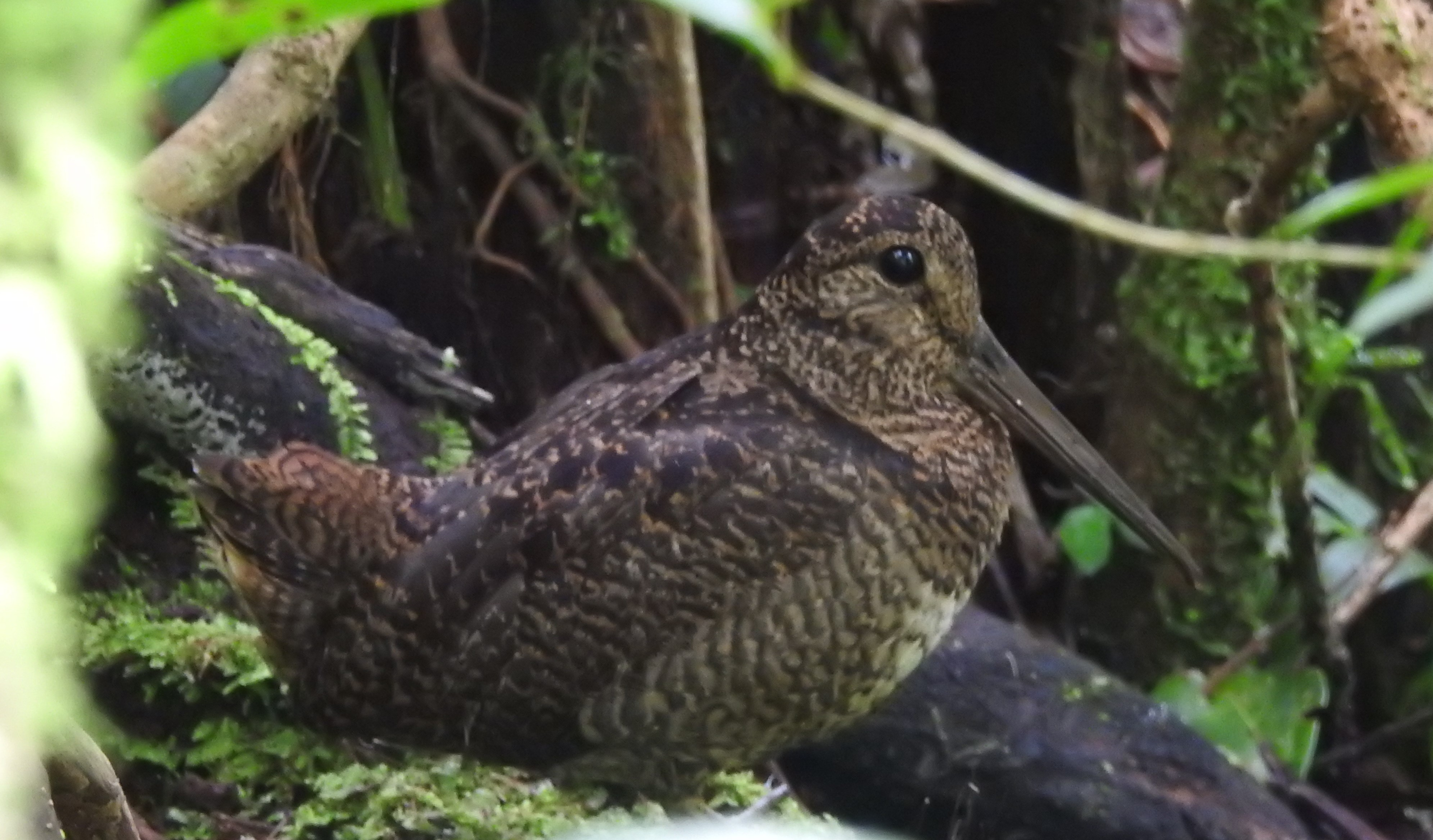

Conservation status
- Near Threatened (IUCN 3.1)

Scientific classification
- Kingdom: Animalia
- Phylum: Chordata
- Class: Aves
- Order: Charadriiformes
- Family: Scolopacidae
- Genus: Scolopax
- Species: S. saturata

Binomial name
- Scolopax saturata Horsfield, 1821
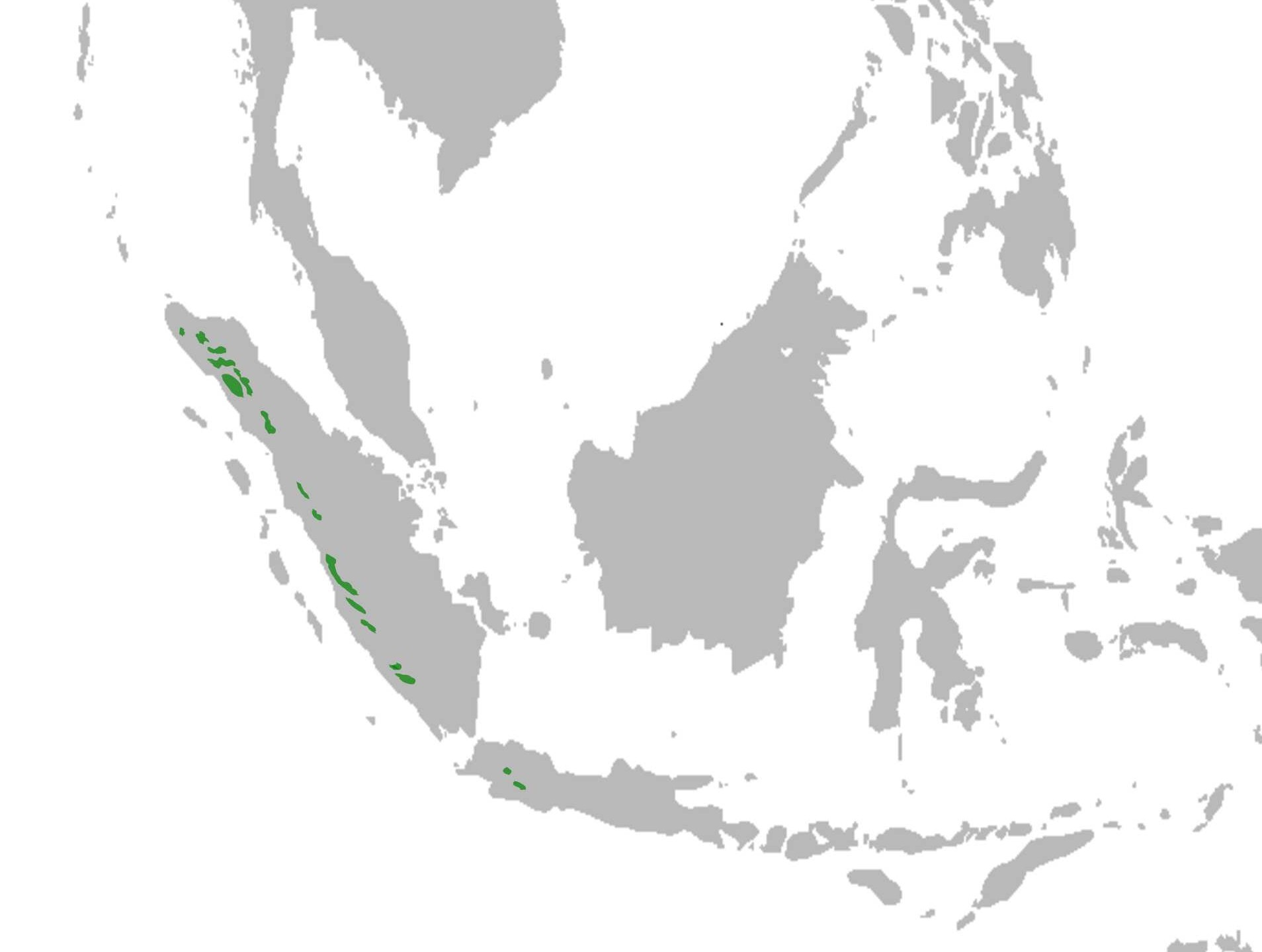

= Javan woodcock =

Species of bird

The Javan woodcock (Scolopax saturata) is a small, long-billed bird in the family Scolopacidae. It is dark brown with a patterned back and measures from 29 to 31 cm (11 to 12 in); it weighs 189–220 g (6.7–7.8 oz). It is endemic to Sumatra and Java, where it inhabits montane forests at the elevation range of 1,500–3,000 m (4,900–9,800 ft).

== Taxonomy ==
The Javan woodcock was first described by Thomas Horsfield in 1821 who collected a specimen near a mountain lake in Java at 2,100 m (7,000 ft). It is sometimes referred to as rufous woodcock due to its coloration, or as Horsfield's woodcock. It is a member of the order Charadriiformes and family Scolopacidae.

The Javan woodcock is a monotypic taxon. The New Guinea woodcock (S. rosenbergii) was formerly treated as a subspecies of it, as Scolopax saturata rosenbergii, but is now accepted as separate species. The calls of Javan woodcock differ from those of the New Guinea woodcock by an introductory harmonic, lack of pauses between repetitions and motifs in the song, and a longer duration of the third part of the song.

== Description ==
The Javan woodcock is a small, dark bird with a long bill, resembling the widespread Eurasian woodcock but significantly smaller, and with darker plumage. Its chin is pale brown, its breast and belly are mottled in dusky brown with a white band in between. There is no record of any differences of plumage between seasons, sex, or age of the Javan woodcock, although research does not show whether such variations exist.

=== Vocal behaviour ===
There is much ambiguity surrounding reports of the call patterns and behaviour. Some observers have reported its calling whilst in flight, whereas others have reported calling only when on its display perch. Different researchers have also reported slightly different call patterns.

== Distribution and habitat ==
The Javan woodcock is endemic to the Indonesian islands of Sumatra and Java, where it inhabits moist montane forests at an elevation range of 1,500–3,000 m (4,900–9,800 ft). During surveys in Java from 2018 to 2020, it was recorded at four sites and three mountains, with an encounter rate of 0.33 groups per hour. Its estimated extent of occurrence is 305,000 km^{2} (118,000 sq mi). Some records of the Javan woodcock are also known in swampy montane forests with bracken and moss vegetation.

The Javan woodcock population is thought to be decreasing, with an estimated 2,500 to 9,999 mature individuals in 10 to 50 subpopulations and at most 1,000 individuals per subpopulation.

== Behaviour and ecology ==
=== Breeding ===
The breeding display and habits of the Javan woodcock are little known. Individuals have consistent and well-recorded roding flights, which are a territorial display. Javan woodcock display is timed relative to other species, and its activity coincides with the calling times of Salvadori's nightjar and happens when it is too dark for the appearance of diurnal passerines and too light for nocturnal species. Its display consistently takes place at dawn and dusk, when it perches on a branch, calls, and then flies to another tree to call again. Adding to the consistency of the display, the Javan woodcock always follows the same path during its roding displays and perches on the same trees. Although the timing of its displays is similar to that of other woodcocks, Javan woodcock display is set apart by the fact that they only call while perched on a tree, as opposed to other woodcocks that call while in flight. The Javan woodcock likely lays two eggs per clutch.

=== Diet ===
The Javan woodcock forages in dense vegetation, and its diet consists primarily of insects including grasshoppers, earwigs, larvae, caterpillars and moth pupae, spiders, centipedes and worms.

== Threats ==
The Javan woodcock has been declared as "Near Threatened" as of 2023. It has a small population size and is composed of many isolated subpopulations. Its limited range is currently affected by gradual loss of its forest habitats due to threats such as logging and agricultural expansion encroaching on the woodcock's territory.

== Conservation ==
Many protected areas in Sumatra and Java coincide with the habitat range of the Javan woodcock, under UNEP-WCMC and IUCN 2023. Although no specific monitoring programs have been put in place for it, surveys have been recommended to exactly determine its population size and distribution.
