= Sulawesi woodcock =

Conservation status
- Least Concern (IUCN 3.1)

Scientific classification
- Kingdom: Animalia
- Phylum: Chordata
- Class: Aves
- Order: Charadriiformes
- Family: Scolopacidae
- Genus: Scolopax
- Species: S. celebensis

Binomial name
- Scolopax celebensis Riley, 1921

Species of bird

The Sulawesi woodcock (Scolopax celebensis) also known as Celebes woodcock, is a medium-sized wader. It is larger and darker than Eurasian woodcock but with small reddish spots.

This species is restricted to wet mountain forests on the Indonesian island of Sulawesi. Little is known of its habits.
