= List of birds of Kenai Fjords National Park =

This is a comprehensive listing of the bird species recorded in Kenai Fjords National Park, which is in the U.S. state of Alaska. Unless otherwise noted, this list is based on one published by the National Park Service (NPS) as of September 2025. Most of the waters adjacent to the park are not actually part of it even when (as in the fjords), the water is almost entirely surrounded by park land. Species recorded in waters near the park are also included here.

This list is presented in the taxonomic sequence of the Check-list of North and Middle American Birds, 7th edition through the 66th Supplement, published by the American Ornithological Society (AOS). Common and scientific names are also those of the Check-list, except that the common names of families are from the Clements taxonomy because the AOS list does not include them.

This list contains 226 species when taxonomic changes have been made. The following codes and definitions are used by the NPS to annotate some of them. The others are residents and regular migrants which a visitor can expect to see at least monthly in the proper season and habitat.

- (PP) = Probably present - "High confidence species occurs in park but current, verified evidence needed" (17 species)
- (Unc) = Unconfirmed - "Species is attributed to park but evidence is weak or absent" (37 species)
- (Adj) = Adjacent - "Species is known to occur in areas near to or contiguous with park boundaries" (31 species)
- (R) = Rare - "Present, but usually seen only a few times each year" (27 species)
- (O) = Occasional - "Occurs in the park at least once every few years, varying in numbers, but not necessarily every year" (13 species)

== Ducks, geese, and waterfowl ==
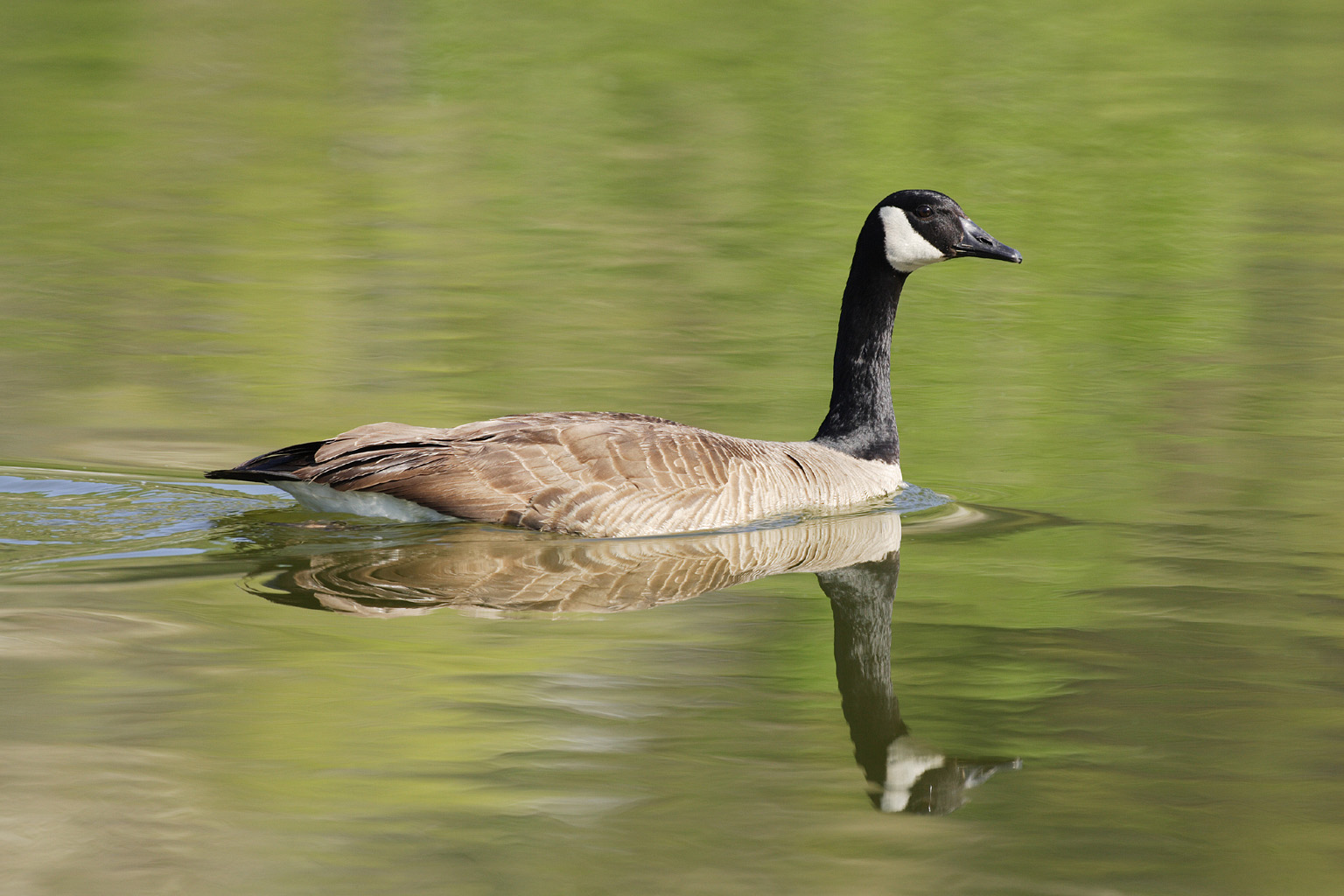
Canada goose

Order: Anseriformes Family: Anatidae

The family Anatidae includes the ducks and most duck-like waterfowl, such as geese and swans. These birds are adapted to an aquatic existence with webbed feet, bills which are flattened to a greater or lesser extent, and feathers that are excellent at shedding water due to special oils.

- Emperor goose, Anser canagica (PP)
- Snow goose, Anser caerulescens (Unc)
- Greater white-fronted goose, Anser albifrons (O)
- Brant, Branta bernicla
- Canada goose, Branta canadensis
- Trumpeter swan, Cygnus buccinator (R)
- Tundra swan, Cygnus columbianus (O)
- Blue-winged teal, Spatula discors (PP)
- Cinnamon teal, Spatula cyanoptera (Unc)
- Northern shoveler, Spatula clypeata (R)
- Gadwall, Mareca strepera
- Eurasian wigeon, Mareca penelope (O)
- American wigeon, Mareca americana
- Mallard, Anas platyrhynchos
- Northern pintail, Anas acuta
- Green-winged teal, Anas crecca
- Canvasback, Aythya valisineria (O)
- Redhead, Aythya americana (Unc)
- Ring-necked duck, Aythya collaris (O)
- Greater scaup, Aythya marila
- Lesser scaup, Aythya affinis (PP)
- Steller's eider, Polysticta stelleri (Adj)
- King eider, Somateria spectabilis (Adj)
- Common eider, Somateria mollissima (Adj)
- Harlequin duck, Histrionicus histrionicus
- Surf scoter, Melanitta perspicillata (Adj)
- White-winged scoter, Melanitta deglandi (Adj)
- Black scoter, Melanitta americana (Adj)
- Long-tailed duck, Clangula hyemalis
- Bufflehead, Bucephala albeola
- Common goldeneye, Bucephala clangula
- Barrow's goldeneye, Bucephala islandica
- Hooded merganser, Lophodytes cucullatus (PP)
- Common merganser, Mergus merganser
- Red-breasted merganser, Mergus serrator

== Pheasants, grouse, and allies ==
Order: Galliformes Family: Phasianidae

Phasianidae consists of the pheasants and their allies. These are terrestrial species, variable in size but generally plump with broad relatively short wings. Many species are gamebirds or have been domesticated as a food source for humans.

- Spruce grouse, Canachites canadensis
- Willow ptarmigan, Lagopus lagopus
- Rock ptarmigan, Lagopus muta
- White-tailed ptarmigan, Lagopus leucurus (R)

== Grebes ==
Order: Podicipediformes Family: Podicipedidae

Grebes are small to medium-large freshwater diving birds. They have lobed toes and are excellent swimmers and divers. However, they have their feet placed far back on the body, making them quite ungainly on land.

- Horned grebe, Podiceps auritus (Adj)
- Red-necked grebe, Podiceps grisegena (Adj)

== Pigeons and doves ==
Order: Columbiformes Family: Columbidae

Pigeons and doves are stout-bodied birds with short necks and short slender bills with a fleshy cere.

- Mourning dove, Zenaida macroura (Unc)
- Rock pigeon, Columba livia (Unc) (Introduced to Alaska)

== Hummingbirds ==
Order: Apodiformes Family: Trochilidae

Hummingbirds are small birds capable of hovering in mid-air due to the rapid flapping of their wings. They are the only birds that can fly backwards.

- Rufous hummingbird, Selasphorus rufus

== Cranes ==
Order: Gruiformes Family: Gruidae

Cranes are large, long-legged, and long-necked birds. Unlike the similar-looking but unrelated herons, cranes fly with necks outstretched, not pulled back. Most have elaborate and noisy courting displays or "dances".

- Sandhill crane, Antigone canadensis

== Oystercatchers ==
Order: Charadriiformes Family: Haematopodidae

The oystercatchers are large, obvious, and noisy plover-like birds, with strong bills used for smashing or prising open molluscs.

- Black oystercatcher, Haematopus bachmani

== Plovers and lapwings ==
Order: Charadriiformes Family: Charadriidae

The family Charadriidae includes the plovers, dotterels, and lapwings. They are small to medium-sized birds with compact bodies, short thick necks, and long, usually pointed, wings. They are found in open country worldwide, mostly in habitats near water.

- Black-bellied plover, Pluvialis squatarola
- American golden-plover, Pluvialis dominica (R)
- Pacific golden-plover, Pluvialis fulva (Unc)
- Killdeer, Charadrius vociferus (Unc)
- Semipalmated plover, Charadrius semipalmatus

== Sandpipers and allies ==
Order: Charadriiformes Family: Scolopacidae

Scolopacidae is a large diverse family of small to medium-sized shorebirds including the sandpipers, curlews, godwits, shanks, tattlers, woodcocks, snipes, dowitchers, and phalaropes. The majority of these species eat small invertebrates picked out of the mud or soil. Different lengths of legs and bills enable multiple species to feed in the same habitat, particularly on the coast, without direct competition for food.

- Whimbrel, Numenius phaeopus
- Far Eastern curlew, Numenius madagascariensis (Unc)
- Eurasian curlew, Numenius arquata (Unc)
- Bar-tailed godwit, Limosa lapponica (Unc)
- Hudsonian godwit, Limosa haemastica (PP)
- Marbled godwit, Limosa fedoa (R)
- Ruddy turnstone, Arenaria interpres (R)
- Black turnstone, Arenaria melanocephala
- Surfbird, Calidris virgata (R)
- Sharp-tailed sandpiper, Calidris acuminata (PP)
- Sanderling, Calidris alba (PP)
- Dunlin, Calidris alpina
- Rock sandpiper, Calidris ptilocnemis (R)
- Baird's sandpiper, Calidris bairdii (Unc)
- Least sandpiper, Calidris minutilla
- Pectoral sandpiper, Calidris melanotos
- Semipalmated sandpiper, Calidris pusilla (R)
- Western sandpiper, Calidris mauri
- Short-billed dowitcher, Limnodromus griseus
- Long-billed dowitcher, Limnodromus scolopaceus (PP)
- Wilson's snipe, Gallinago delicata
- Spotted sandpiper, Actitis macularia
- Solitary sandpiper, Tringa solitaria (O)
- Gray-tailed tattler, Tringa brevipes (Unc)
- Wandering tattler, Tringa incana
- Lesser yellowlegs, Tringa flavipes
- Greater yellowlegs, Tringa melanoleuca
- Red-necked phalarope, Phalaropus lobatus
- Red phalarope, Phalaropus fulicarius (R)

== Skuas and jaegers ==
Order: Charadriiformes Family: Stercorariidae

Jaegers and skuas are in general medium to large birds, typically with gray or brown plumage, often with white markings on the wings. They have longish bills with hooked tips and webbed feet with sharp claws. They look like large dark gulls, but have a fleshy cere above the upper mandible. They are strong, acrobatic fliers.

- Pomarine jaeger, Stercorarius pomarinus (Adj)
- Parasitic jaeger, Stercorarius parasiticus (R)
- Long-tailed jaeger, Stercorarius longicaudus (Adj)

== Auks, murres, and puffins ==
Order: Charadriiformes Family: Alcidae

The family Alcidae includes auks, murres, and puffins. These are short-winged birds that live on the open sea and normally only come ashore for breeding.

- Common murre, Uria aalge
- Thick-billed murre, Uria lomvia (R)
- Pigeon guillemot, Cepphus columba
- Marbled murrelet, Brachyramphus marmoratus
- Kittlitz's murrelet, Brachyramphus brevirostris
- Ancient murrelet, Synthliboarmphus antiquus (Adj)
- Cassin's auklet, Ptychoramphus aleuticus (Adj)
- Parakeet auklet, Aethia psittacula (Adj)
- Least auklet, Aethia pusilla (Unc)
- Crested auklet, Aethia cristatella (PP)
- Rhinoceros auklet, Cerorhinca monocerata (Adj)
- Horned puffin, Fratercula corniculata
- Tufted puffin, Fratercula cirrhata

== Gulls, terns, and skimmers ==
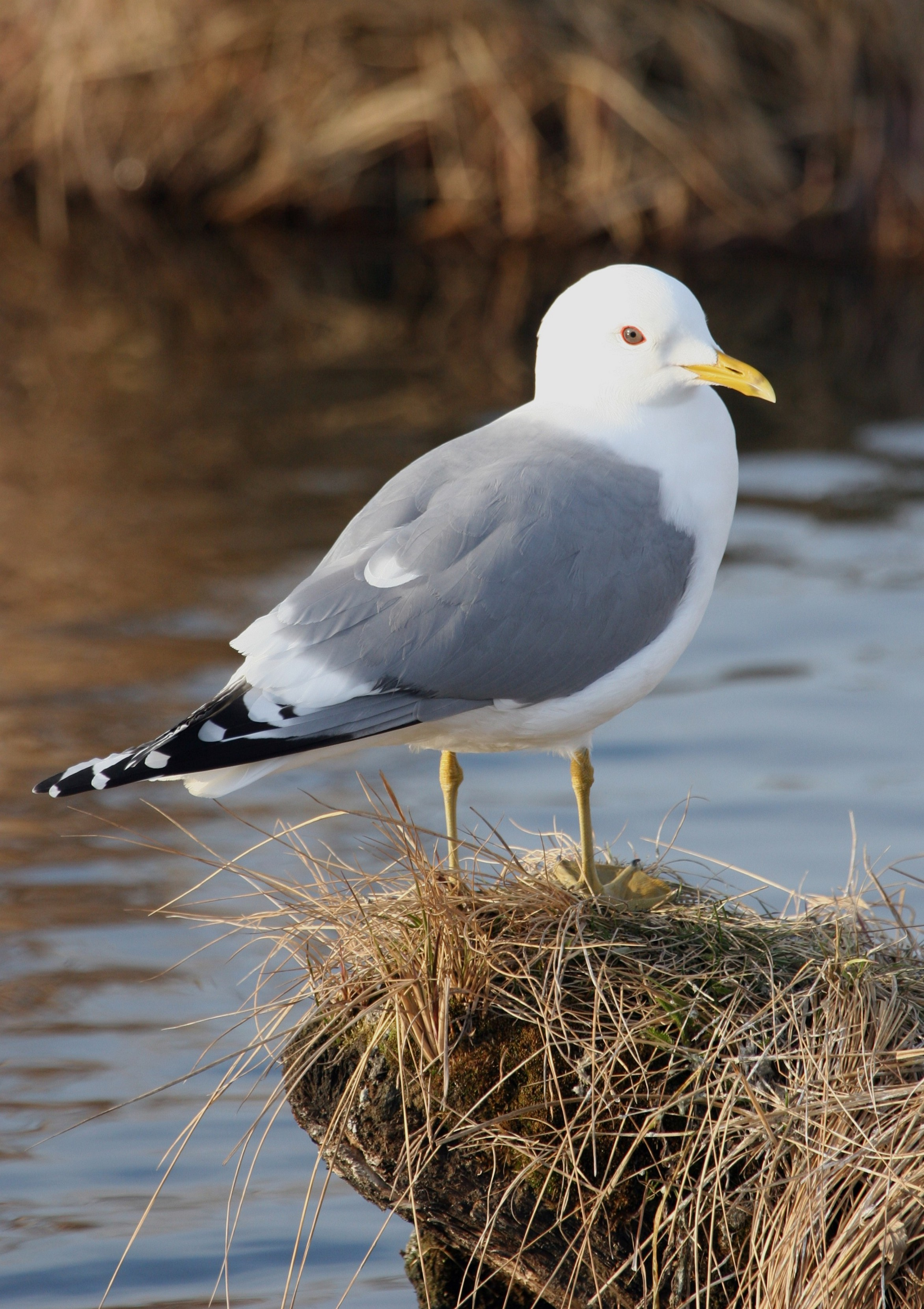
Short-billed gull

Order: Charadriiformes Family: Laridae

Laridae is a family of medium to large seabirds and includes gulls, terns, kittiwakes, and skimmers. They are typically gray or white, often with black markings on the head or wings. They have stout, longish bills and webbed feet.

- Black-legged kittiwake, Rissa tridactyla
- Red-legged kittiwake, Rissa brevirostris (Unc)
- Ivory gull, Pagophila eburnea (Unc)
- Sabine's gull, Xema sabini (Adj)
- Bonaparte's gull, Chroicocephalus philadelphia
- Black-headed gull, Chroicocephalus ridibundus (O)
- Short-billed gull, Larus brachyrhynchus
- Ring-billed gull, Larus delawarensis (Unc)
- Herring gull, Larus argentatus
- Iceland gull, Larus glaucoides (Adj)
- Glaucous-winged gull, Larus glaucescens
- Glaucous gull, Larus hyperboreus
- Aleutian tern, Onychoprion aleuticus (O)
- Caspian tern, Hydroprogne caspia (PP)
- Arctic tern, Sterna paradisaea

== Loons ==
Order: Gaviiformes Family: Gaviidae

Loons are aquatic birds the size of a large duck, to which they are unrelated. Their plumage is largely gray or black, and they have spear-shaped bills. Loons swim well and fly adequately, but are almost hopeless on land, because their legs are placed towards the rear of the body.

- Red-throated loon, Gavia stellata (Adj)
- Pacific loon, Gavia pacifica (Adj)
- Common loon, Gavia immer (Adj)
- Yellow-billed loon, Gavia adamsii (Adj)

== Albatrosses ==
Order: Procellariiformes Family: Diomedeidae

The albatrosses are amongst the largest of flying birds, and the great albatrosses from the genus Diomedea have the largest wingspans of any extant birds.

- Laysan albatross, Phoebastria immutabilis (Adj)
- Black-footed albatross, Phoebastria nigripes (Adj)
- Short-tailed albatross, Phoebastria albatrus (Adj)

== Northern storm-petrels ==
Order: Procellariiformes Family: Hydrobatidae

The storm-petrels are the smallest seabirds, relatives of the petrels, feeding on planktonic crustaceans and small fish picked from the surface, typically while hovering. The flight is fluttering and sometimes bat-like.

- Fork-tailed storm-petrel, Hydrobates furcatus (Adj)
- Leach's storm-petrel, Hydrobates leucorhous (Adj)

== Shearwaters and petrels ==
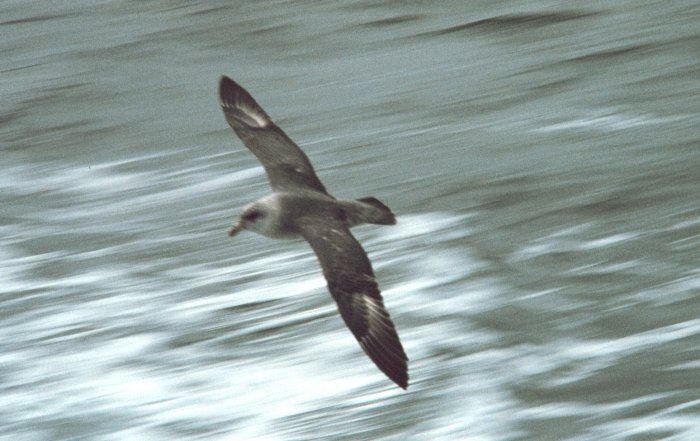
Northern fulmar

Order: Procellariiformes Family: Procellariidae

The procellariids are the main group of medium-sized "true petrels", characterized by united nostrils with medium septum and a long outer functional primary.

- Northern fulmar, Fulmarus glacialis (Adj)
- Mottled petrel, Pterodroma inexpectata (Adj)
- Buller's shearwater, Ardenna bulleri (Adj)
- Short-tailed shearwater, Ardenna tenuirostris (Adj)
- Sooty shearwater, Ardenna griseus (Adj)
- Pink-footed shearwater, Ardenna creatopus (Adj)
- Flesh-footed shearwater, Ardenna carneipes (Unc)
- Manx shearwater, Puffinus puffinus (Unc)

== Cormorants and shags ==
Order: Suliformes Family: Phalacrocoracidae

Cormorants are medium-to-large aquatic birds, usually with mainly dark plumage and areas of colored skin on the face. The bill is long, thin, and sharply hooked. Their feet are four-toed and webbed.

- Brandt's cormorant, Urile penicillatus (Unc)
- Red-faced cormorant, Urile urile
- Pelagic cormorant, Urile pelagicus
- Double-crested cormorant, Nannopterum auritum

== Herons, egrets, and bitterns ==
Order: Pelecaniformes Family: Ardeidae

The family Ardeidae contains the herons, egrets, and bitterns. Herons and egrets are medium to large wading birds with long necks and legs. Bitterns tend to be shorter necked and more secretive. Members of Ardeidae fly with their necks retracted, unlike other long-necked birds such as storks, ibises, and spoonbills.

- Great blue heron, Ardea herodias (R)

== Osprey ==
Order: Accipitriformes Family: Pandionidae

Pandionidae is a monotypic family of fish-eating birds of prey. Its single species possesses a very large and powerful hooked beak, strong legs, strong talons, and keen eyesight.

- Osprey, Pandion haliaetus (PP)

== Hawks, eagles, and kites ==
Order: Accipitriformes Family: Accipitridae

Accipitridae is a family of birds of prey which includes hawks, eagles, kites, harriers, and Old World vultures. These birds have very large powerful hooked beaks for tearing flesh from their prey, strong legs, powerful talons, and keen eyesight.

- Golden eagle, Aquila chrysaetos (R)
- Sharp-shinned hawk, Accipiter striatus
- American goshawk, Astur atricapillus
- Northern harrier, Circus hudsonius
- Bald eagle, Haliaeetus leucocephalus
- Swainson's hawk, Buteo swainsoni (Unc)
- Red-tailed hawk, Buteo jamaicensis (Unc)
- Rough-legged hawk, Buteo lagopus (R)

== Owls ==
Order: Strigiformes Family: Strigidae

Typical owls are small to large solitary nocturnal birds of prey. They have large forward-facing eyes and ears, a hawk-like beak, and a conspicuous circle of feathers around each eye called a facial disk.

- Western screech-owl, Megascops kennicottii (PP)
- Great horned owl, Bubo virginianus
- Snowy owl, Bubo scandiacus (Unc)
- Northern hawk owl, Surnia ulula (PP)
- Great gray owl, Strix nebulosa (PP)
- Short-eared owl, Asio flammeus (PP)
- Boreal owl, Aegolius funereus (PP)
- Northern saw-whet owl, Aegolius acadicus (PP)

== Kingfishers ==
Order: Coraciiformes Family: Alcedinidae

Kingfishers are medium-sized birds with large heads, long, pointed bills, short legs, and stubby tails.

- Belted kingfisher, Megaceryle alcyon

== Woodpeckers ==
Order: Piciformes Family: Picidae

Woodpeckers are small to medium-sized birds with chisel-like beaks, short legs, stiff tails, and long tongues used for capturing insects. Some species have feet with two toes pointing forward and two backward, while several species have only three toes. Many woodpeckers have the habit of tapping noisily on tree trunks with their beaks.

- American three-toed woodpecker, Picoides dorsalis (Unc)
- Black-backed woodpecker, Picoides arcticus (O)
- Downy woodpecker, Dryobates pubescens
- Hairy woodpecker, Dryobates villosus
- Northern flicker, Colaptes auratus (R)

== Falcons and caracaras ==
Order: Falconiformes Family: Falconidae

Falconidae is a family of diurnal birds of prey, notably the falcons and caracaras. They differ from hawks, eagles, and kites in that they kill with their beaks instead of their talons.

- Merlin, Falco columbarius (R)
- Gyrfalcon, Falco rusticolus (O)
- Peregrine falcon, Falco peregrinus (R)

== Tyrant flycatchers ==
Order: Passeriformes Family: Tyrannidae

Tyrant flycatchers are Passerine birds which occur throughout North and South America. They superficially resemble the Old World flycatchers, but are more robust and have stronger bills. They do not have the sophisticated vocal capabilities of the songbirds. Most, but not all, are rather plain. As the name implies, most are insectivorous.

- Western kingbird, Tyrannus verticalis (Unc)
- Olive-sided flycatcher, Contopus cooperi (R)
- Western wood-pewee, Contopus sordidulus (R)
- Alder flycatcher, Empidonax alnorum
- Say's phoebe, Sayornis saya (Unc)

== Vireos, shrike-babblers, and erpornis ==
Order: Passeriformes Family: Vireonidae

The vireos are a group of small to medium-sized passerine birds restricted to the New World. They are typically greenish in color and resemble wood warblers apart from their heavier bills.

- Warbling vireo, Vireo gilvus (Unc)

== Shrikes ==
Order: Passeriformes Family: Laniidae

Shrikes are passerine birds known for their habit of catching other birds and small animals and impaling the uneaten portions of their bodies on thorns. A shrike's beak is hooked, like that of a typical bird of prey.

- Northern shrike, Lanius borealis (R)

== Crows, jays, and magpies ==
Order: Passeriformes Family: Corvidae

The family Corvidae includes crows, ravens, jays, choughs, magpies, treepies, nutcrackers, and ground jays. Corvids are above average in size among the Passeriformes, and some of the larger species show high levels of intelligence.

- Canada jay, Perisoreus canadensis
- Steller's jay, Cyanocitta stelleri
- Black-billed magpie, Pica hudsonia
- American crow, Corvus brachyrhynchos
- Common raven, Corvus corax

== Tits, chickadees, and titmice ==
Order: Passeriformes Family: Paridae

The Paridae are mainly small stocky woodland species with short stout bills. Some have crests. They are adaptable birds, with a mixed diet including seeds and insects.

- Black-capped chickadee, Poecile atricapilla
- Chestnut-backed chickadee, Poecile rufescens
- Boreal chickadee, Poecile hudsonica

== Larks ==
Order: Passeriformes Family: Alaudidae

Larks are small terrestrial birds with often extravagant songs and display flights. Most larks are fairly dull in appearance. Their food is insects and seeds.

- Horned lark, Eremophila alpestris (Unc)

== Swallows ==
Order: Passeriformes Family: Hirundinidae

The family Hirundinidae is a group of passerines characterized by their adaptation to aerial feeding. These adaptations include a slender streamlined body, long pointed wings, and short bills with a wide gape. The feet are adapted to perching rather than walking, and the front toes are partially joined at the base.

- Bank swallow, Riparia riparia
- Tree swallow, Tachycineta bicolor
- Violet-green swallow, Tachycineta thalassina
- Purple martin, Progne subis (Unc)
- Barn swallow, Hirundo rustica (Unc)
- Cliff swallow, Petrochelidon pyrrhonota (Unc)

== Kinglets ==
Order: Passeriformes Family: Regulidae

The kinglets are a small family of birds which resemble the titmice. They are very small insectivorous birds, mostly in the genus Regulus. The adults have colored crowns, giving rise to their names.

- Ruby-crowned kinglet, Corthylio calendula
- Golden-crowned kinglet, Regulus satrapa

== Waxwings ==
Order: Passeriformes Family: Bombycillidae

The waxwings are a group of birds with soft silky plumage and unique red tips to some of the wing feathers. In the Bohemian and cedar waxwings, these tips look like sealing wax and give the group its name. These are arboreal birds of northern forests. They live on insects in summer and berries in winter.

- Bohemian waxwing, Bombycilla garrulus (R)
- Cedar waxwing, Bombycilla cedrorum (Unc)

== Nuthatches ==
Order: Passeriformes Family: Sittidae

Nuthatches are small woodland birds. They have the unusual ability to climb down trees head first, unlike other birds which can only go upwards. Nuthatches have big heads, short tails, and powerful bills and feet.

- Red-breasted nuthatch, Sitta canadensis

== Treecreepers ==
Order: Passeriformes Family: Certhiidae

Treecreepers are small woodland birds, brown above and white below. They have thin pointed down-curved bills, which they use to extricate insects from bark. They have stiff tail feathers, like woodpeckers, which they use to support themselves on vertical trees.

- Brown creeper, Certhia americana (R)

== Wrens ==
Order: Passeriformes Family: Troglodytidae

Wrens are small and inconspicuous birds, except for their loud songs. They have short wings and thin down-turned bills. Several species often hold their tails upright.

- Pacific wren, Troglodytes pacificus

== Starlings ==
Order: Passeriformes Family: Sturnidae

Starlings are small to medium-sized passerine birds. They are medium-sized passerines with strong feet. Their flight is strong and direct and they are very gregarious. Their preferred habitat is fairly open country, and they eat insects and fruit. Plumage is typically dark with a metallic sheen.

- European starling, Sturnus vulgaris (R) (Introduced to North America)

== Dippers ==
Order: Passeriformes Family: Cinclidae

Dippers are small, stout, birds that feed in cold, fast moving streams.

- American dipper, Cinclus mexicanus

== Thrushes and allies ==
Order: Passeriformes Family: Turdidae

The thrushes are a group of passerine birds that occur mainly but not exclusively in the Old World. They are plump, soft plumaged, small to medium-sized insectivores or sometimes omnivores, often feeding on the ground. Many have attractive songs.

- Townsend's solitaire, Myadestes townsendi (O)
- Gray-cheeked thrush, Catharus minimus
- Swainson's thrush, Catharus ustulatus
- Hermit thrush, Catharus guttatus
- American robin, Turdus migratorius
- Varied thrush, Ixoreus naevius

== Old World flycatchers ==
Order: Passeriformes Family: Muscicapidae

This a large family of small passerine birds restricted to the Old World. Most of the species below only occur in North America as vagrants. The appearance of these birds is highly varied, but they mostly have weak songs and harsh calls.

- Northern wheatear, Oenanthe oenanthe (Unc)

== Wagtails and pipits ==
Order: Passeriformes Family: Motacillidae

Motacillidae is a family of small passerine birds with medium to long tails. They include the wagtails, longclaws, and pipits. They are slender ground-feeding insectivores of open country.

- American pipit, Anthus rubescens

== Finches, euphonias, and allies ==
Order: Passeriformes Family: Fringillidae

Finches are seed-eating passerine birds, that are small to moderately large and have a strong beak, usually conical and in some species very large. All have twelve tail feathers and nine primaries. These birds have a bouncing flight with alternating bouts of flapping and gliding on closed wings, and most sing well.

- Brambling, Fringilla montifringilla (O)
- Pine grosbeak, Pinicola enucleator
- Gray-crowned rosy-finch, Leucosticte tephrocotis
- Redpoll, Acanthis flammea
- Red crossbill, Loxia curvirostra
- White-winged crossbill, Loxia leucoptera
- Pine siskin, Spinus pinus

== Longspurs and snow buntings ==
Order: Passeriformes Family: Calcariidae

The Calcariidae are a group of passerine birds that had been traditionally grouped with the New World sparrows, but differ in a number of respects and are usually found in open grassy areas.

- Lapland longspur, Calcarius lapponicus (Unc)
- Snow bunting, Plectrophenax nivalis
- McKay's bunting, Plectrophenax hyperboreus (Unc)

== New World sparrows ==
Order: Passeriformes Family: Passerellidae

Until 2017, these species were considered part of the family Emberizidae. Most of the species are known as sparrows, but these birds are not closely related to the Old World sparrows which are in the family Passeridae. Many of these have distinctive head patterns.

- Fox sparrow, Passerella iliaca
- American tree sparrow, Spizelloides arborea (O)
- Dark-eyed junco, Junco hyemalis
- White-crowned sparrow, Zonotrichia leucophrys
- Golden-crowned sparrow, Zonotrichia atricapilla
- White-throated sparrow, Zonotrichia albicollis (Unc)
- Savannah sparrow, Passerculus sandwichensis
- Song sparrow, Melospiza melodia
- Lincoln's sparrow, Melospiza lincolnii

== Troupials and allies ==
Order: Passeriformes Family: Icteridae

The icterids are a group of small to medium-sized, often colorful passerine birds restricted to the New World and include the grackles, New World blackbirds, and New World orioles. Most species have black as a predominant plumage color, often enlivened by yellow, orange, or red.

- Red-winged blackbird, Agelaius phoeniceus (Unc)
- Rusty blackbird, Euphagus carolinus (R)

== New World warblers ==
Order: Passeriformes Family: Parulidae

The wood-warblers are a group of small often colorful passerine birds restricted to the New World. Most are arboreal, but some like the ovenbird and the two waterthrushes are more terrestrial. Most members of this family are insectivores.

- Northern waterthrush, Parkesia noveboracensis (R)
- Orange-crowned warbler, Leiothlypis celata
- Yellow warbler, Setophaga petechia
- Blackpoll warbler, Setophaga striata (R)
- Yellow-rumped warbler, Setophaga coronata
- Townsend's warbler, Setophaga townsendi
- Wilson's warbler, Cardellina pusilla

== See also ==
- List of birds of Alaska
- List of birds of Denali National Park and Preserve
- List of birds
- Lists of birds by region
- List of North American birds
