= List of birds of Alaska =

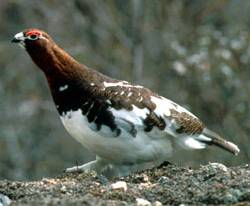
The willow ptarmigan is the state bird of Alaska.

The list of birds of Alaska includes every wild bird species recorded in the U.S. state of Alaska, based on the list published by the Alaska Checklist Committee. As of January 2022, there were 534 species on the official list. Of them, 55 are considered rare, 149 are casual, and 79 are accidental, all as defined below. Another 18 and a species pair are considered unsubstantiated. One species is endemic to the state. One species has been added as a result of a split enacted in June 2021. Additional accidental species have been added from other sources.

Only birds that are considered to have established, self-sustaining, wild populations in Alaska are included on this list. This means that birds that are considered probable escapees, although they may have been sighted flying free in Alaska, are not included. Species which the Checklist Committee considers to depend entirely on human feeding, such as rock pigeon, are also not included.

This list is presented in the taxonomic sequence of the Check-list of North and Middle American Birds, 7th edition through the 62nd Supplement, published by the American Ornithological Society (AOS). Common and scientific names are also those of the Check-list, except that the common names of families are from the Clements taxonomy because the AOS list does not include them.

The following codes and definitions (except En) are used by the Alaska Checklist Committee to annotate some species:

- (R) = Rare - "Annual or possibly annual in small numbers; most such species occur at the perimeter of Alaska, in season; a few are scarce residents"
- (C) = Casual - "Not annual; these species are beyond the periphery of annual range, but recur in Alaska at irregular intervals, usually in seasonal and regional patterns"
- (A) = Accidental - "One or two Alaska records, or none in the last 30 years"
- (U) = Unsubstantiated - "attributed to Alaska without specimen or photo substantiation"
- (En) = Endemic - A species found only in Alaska (except as a vagrant elsewhere)

== Ducks, geese, and waterfowl ==
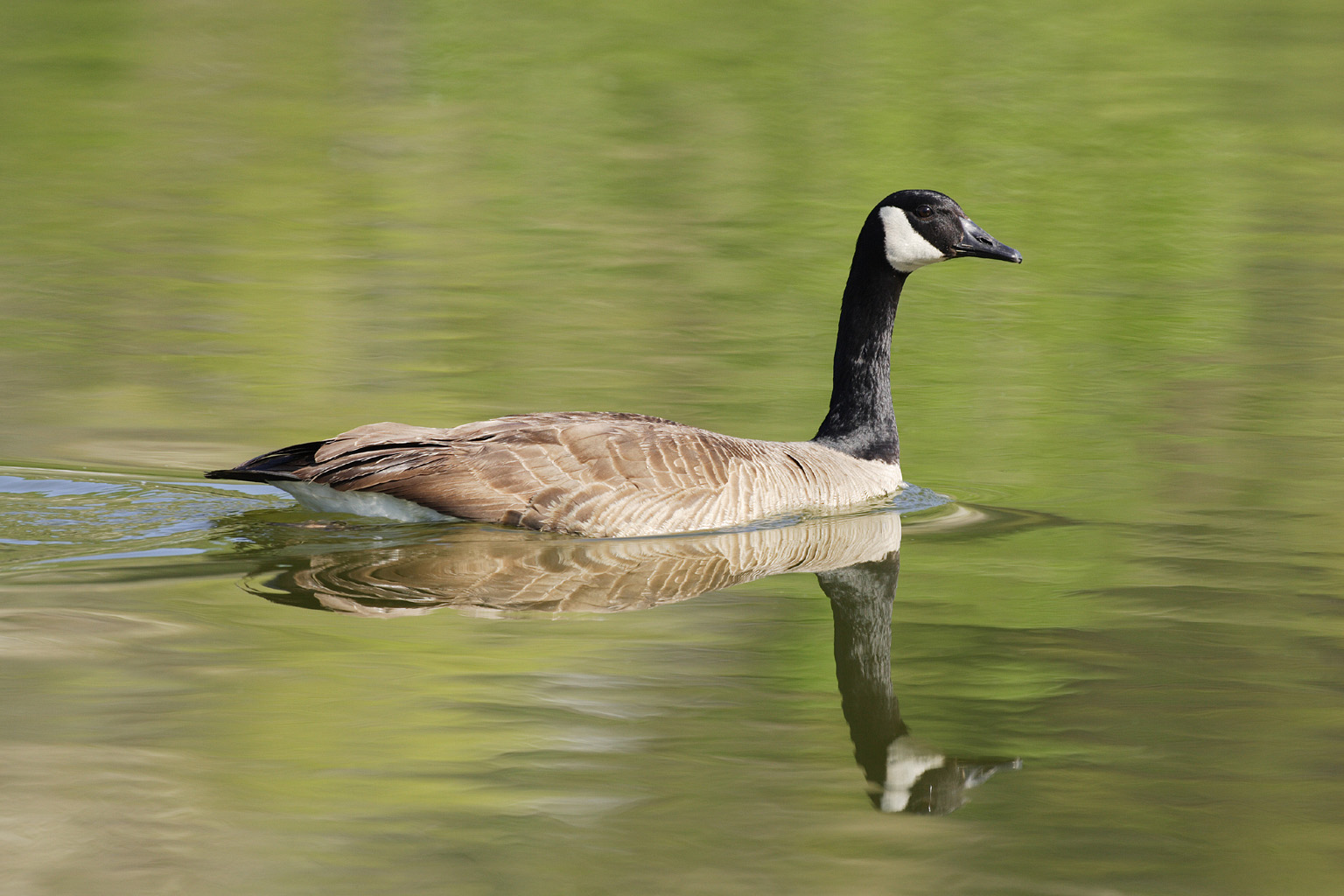
Canada goose

Order: Anseriformes Family: Anatidae

The family Anatidae includes the ducks and most duck-like waterfowl, such as geese and swans. These birds are adapted to an aquatic existence with webbed feet, bills which are flattened to a greater or lesser extent, and feathers that are excellent at shedding water due to special oils.

- Emperor goose, Anser canagica
- Snow goose, Anser caerulescens
- Ross's goose, Anser rossii (C)
- Greater white-fronted goose, Anser albifrons
- Lesser white-fronted goose, Anser erythropus (C)
- Taiga bean-goose, Anser fabalis (C)
- Tundra bean-goose, Anser serrirostris (C)
- Brant, Branta bernicla
- Cackling goose, Branta hutchinsii
- Canada goose, Branta canadensis
- Trumpeter swan, Cygnus buccinator
- Tundra swan, Cygnus columbianus
- Whooper swan, Cygnus cygnus (R)
- Wood duck, Aix sponsa (R)
- Baikal teal, Sibirionetta formosa (C)
- Garganey, Spatula querquedula (C)
- Blue-winged teal, Spatula discors
- Cinnamon teal, Spatula cyanoptera (R)
- Northern shoveler, Spatula clypeata
- Gadwall, Mareca strepera
- Falcated duck, Mareca falcata (C)
- Eurasian wigeon, Mareca penelope
- American wigeon, Mareca americana
- Eastern spot-billed duck, Anas zonorhyncha (C)
- Mallard, Anas platyrhynchos
- American black duck, Anas rubripes (A)
- Northern pintail, Anas acuta
- Green-winged teal, Anas crecca
- Canvasback, Aythya valisineria
- Redhead, Aythya americana
- Common pochard, Aythya ferina (C)
- Ring-necked duck, Aythya collaris
- Tufted duck, Aythya fuligula (R)
- Greater scaup, Aythya marila
- Lesser scaup, Aythya affinis
- Steller's eider, Polysticta stelleri
- Spectacled eider, Somateria fischeri
- King eider, Somateria spectabilis
- Common eider, Somateria mollissima
- Harlequin duck, Histrionicus histrionicus
- Surf scoter, Melanitta perspicillata
- White-winged scoter, Melanitta deglandi
- Stejneger's scoter, Melanitta stejnegeri (C)
- Black scoter, Melanitta americana
- Long-tailed duck, Clangula hyemalis
- Bufflehead, Bucephala albeola
- Common goldeneye, Bucephala clangula
- Barrow's goldeneye, Bucephala islandica
- Smew, Mergellus albellus (R)
- Hooded merganser, Lophodytes cucullatus
- Common merganser, Mergus merganser
- Red-breasted merganser, Mergus serrator
- Ruddy duck, Oxyura jamaicensis (R)

== Grouse, pheasants, and allies ==
Order: Galliformes Family: Phasianidae

Phasianidae consists of the pheasants and their allies. These are terrestrial species, variable in size but generally plump with broad relatively short wings. Many species are gamebirds or have been domesticated as a food source for humans.

- Ruffed grouse, Bonasa umbellus
- Spruce grouse, Canachites canadensis
- Willow ptarmigan, Lagopus lagopus
- Rock ptarmigan, Lagopus muta
- White-tailed ptarmigan, Lagopus leucurus
- Sooty grouse, Dendragapus fuliginosus
- Sharp-tailed grouse, Tympanuchus phasianellus

== Grebes ==
Order: Podicipediformes Family: Podicipedidae

Grebes are small to medium-large freshwater diving birds. They have lobed toes and are excellent swimmers and divers. However, they have their feet placed far back on the body, making them quite ungainly on land.

- Pied-billed grebe, Podilymbus podiceps (R)
- Horned grebe, Podiceps auritus
- Red-necked grebe, Podiceps grisegena
- Eared grebe, Podiceps nigricollis (C)
- Western grebe, Aechmorphorus occidentalis
- Clark's grebe, Aechmophorus clarkii (U)

== Pigeons and doves ==
Order: Columbiformes Family: Columbidae

Pigeons and doves are stout-bodied birds with short necks and short slender bills with a fleshy cere.

- Band-tailed pigeon, Patagioenas fasciata (R)
- Oriental turtle-dove, Streptopelia orientalis (C)
- Eurasian collared-dove, Streptopelia decaocto (Introduced to North America)
- White-winged dove, Zenaida asiatica (C)
- Mourning dove, Zenaida macroura (R)

== Cuckoos ==
Order: Cuculiformes Family: Cuculidae

The family Cuculidae includes cuckoos, roadrunners, and anis. These birds are of variable size with slender bodies, long tails, and strong legs. The Old World cuckoos are brood parasites.

- Common cuckoo, Cuculus canorus (C)
- Oriental cuckoo, Cuculus optatus (C)
- Yellow-billed cuckoo, Coccyzus americanus (C)

== Nightjars and allies ==
Order: Caprimulgiformes Family: Caprimulgidae

Goatsuckers (nightjars) are medium-sized nocturnal birds that usually nest on the ground. They have long wings, short legs, and very short bills. Most have small feet, of little use for walking, and long pointed wings. Their soft plumage is cryptically colored to resemble bark or leaves.

- Lesser nighthawk, Chordeiles acutipennis (A)
- Common nighthawk, Chordeiles minor (R)
- Eastern whip-poor-will, Antrostomus vociferus (A)
- Gray nightjar, Caprimulgus jotaka (A)

== Swifts ==
Order: Apodiformes Family: Apodidae

The swifts are small birds which spend the majority of their lives flying. These birds have very short legs and never settle voluntarily on the ground, perching instead only on vertical surfaces. Many swifts have very long, swept-back wings which resemble a crescent or boomerang.

- Black swift, Cypseloides niger
- Chimney swift, Chaetura pelagica (A)
- Vaux's swift, Chaetura vauxi
- White-throated needletail, Hirundapus caudacutus (C)
- Common swift, Apus apus (C)
- Fork-tailed swift, Apus pacificus (C)

== Hummingbirds ==
Order: Apodiformes Family: Trochilidae

Hummingbirds are small birds capable of hovering in mid-air due to the rapid flapping of their wings. They are the only birds that can fly backwards.

- Ruby-throated hummingbird, Archilochus colubris (C)
- Anna's hummingbird, Calypte anna
- Costa's hummingbird, Calypte costae (C)
- Calliope hummingbird, Selasphorus calliope (C)
- Rufous hummingbird, Selasphorus rufus

== Rails, gallinules, and coots ==
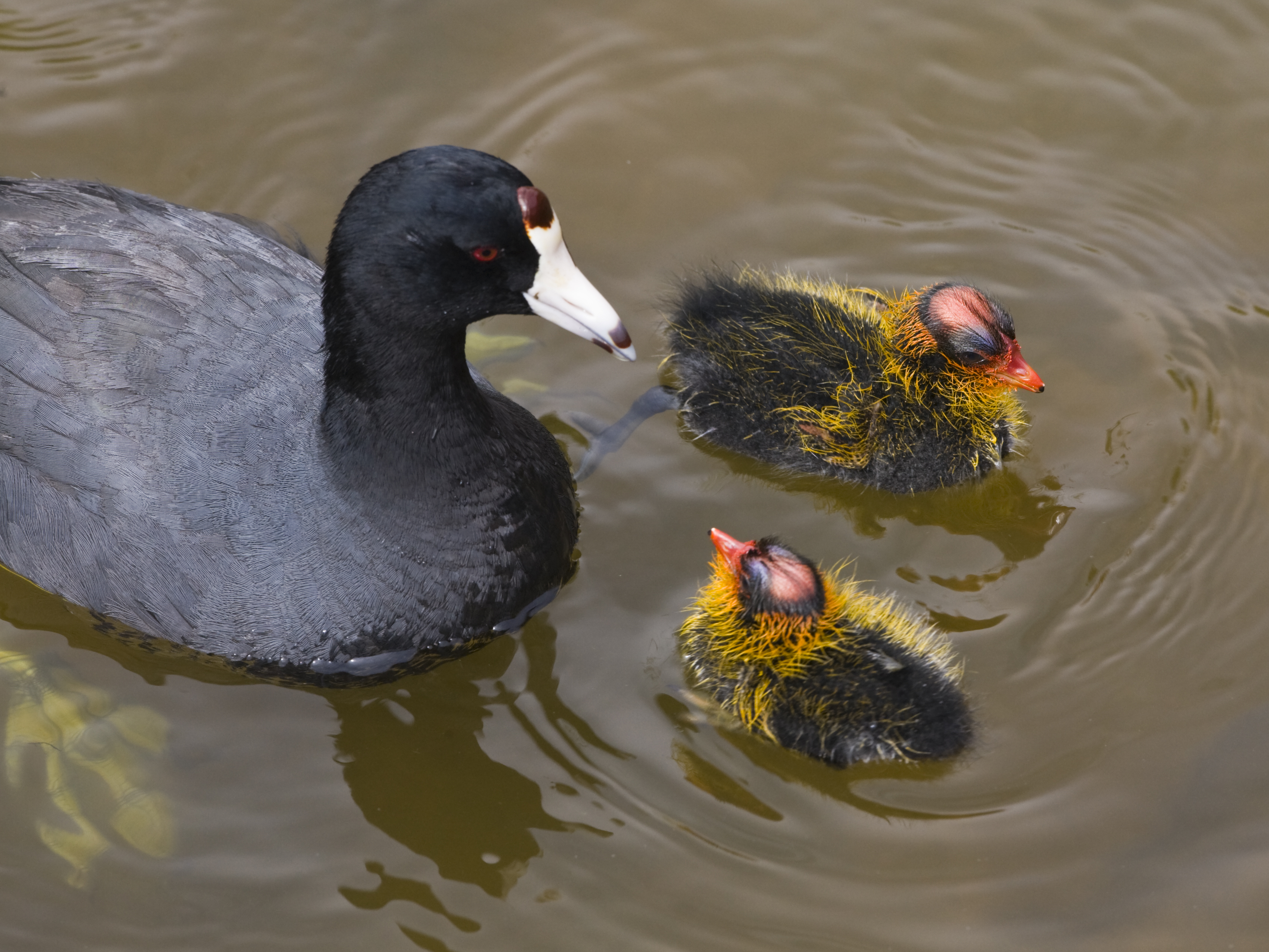
American coot

Order: Gruiformes Family: Rallidae

Rallidae is a large family of small to medium-sized birds which includes the rails, crakes, coots, and gallinules. The most typical family members occupy dense vegetation in damp environments near lakes, swamps, or rivers. In general they are shy and secretive birds, making them difficult to observe. Most species have strong legs and long toes which are well adapted to soft uneven surfaces. They tend to have short, rounded wings and tend to be weak fliers.

- Virginia rail, Rallus limicola (C)
- Sora, Porzana carolina (R)
- Baillon's crake, Porzana pusilla (U) (This species is not on the AOS Check-list; moreover, it is assigned to genus Zapornia by the Clements taxonomy.)
- Common moorhen, Gallinula chloropus (A)
- Eurasian coot. Fulica atra (A)
- American coot, Fulica americana (R)
- Yellow rail, Coturnicops noveboracensis (U)

== Cranes ==
Order: Gruiformes Family: Gruidae

Cranes are large, long-legged, and long-necked birds. Unlike the similar-looking but unrelated herons, cranes fly with necks outstretched, not pulled back. Most have elaborate and noisy courting displays or "dances".

- Sandhill crane, Antigone canadensis
- Common crane, Grus grus (A)
- Hooded crane, Grus monacha (A)

== Stilts and avocets ==
Order: Charadriiformes Family: Recurvirostridae

Recurvirostridae is a family of large wading birds which includes the avocets and stilts. The avocets have long legs and long up-curved bills. The stilts have extremely long legs and long, thin, straight bills.

- Black-winged stilt, Himantopus himantopus (C)
- American avocet, Recurvirostra americana (C)

== Oystercatchers ==
Order: Charadriiformes Family: Haematopodidae

The oystercatchers are large, obvious, and noisy plover-like birds, with strong bills used for smashing or prising open molluscs.

- Eurasian oystercatcher, Haematopus ostralegus (A)
- Black oystercatcher, Haematopus bachmani

== Lapwings and plovers ==
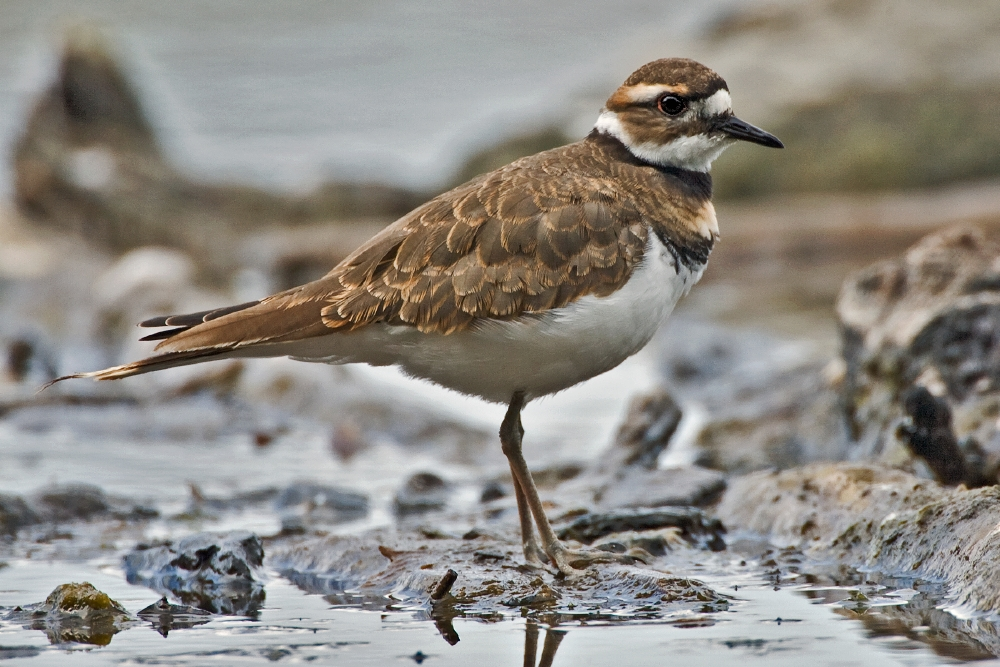
Killdeer

Order: Charadriiformes Family: Charadriidae

The family Charadriidae includes the plovers, dotterels, and lapwings. They are small to medium-sized birds with compact bodies, short thick necks, and long, usually pointed, wings. They are found in open country worldwide, mostly in habitats near water.

- Northern lapwing, Vanellus vanellus (A)
- Black-bellied plover, Pluvialis squatarola
- European golden-plover, Pluvialis apricaria (C)
- American golden-plover, Pluvialis dominica
- Pacific golden-plover, Pluvialis fulva
- Eurasian dotterel, Charadrius morinellus (C)
- Killdeer, Charadrius vociferus
- Common ringed plover, Charadrius hiaticula (R)
- Semipalmated plover, Charadrius semipalmatus
- Little ringed plover, Charadrius dubius (C)
- Lesser sand-plover, Charadrius mongolus (R)
- Snowy plover, Charadrius nivosus (A)

== Sandpipers and allies ==
Order: Charadriiformes Family: Scolopacidae

Scolopacidae is a large diverse family of small to medium-sized shorebirds including the sandpipers, curlews, godwits, shanks, tattlers, woodcocks, snipes, dowitchers, and phalaropes. The majority of these species eat small invertebrates picked out of the mud or soil. Different lengths of legs and bills enable multiple species to feed in the same habitat, particularly on the coast, without direct competition for food.

- Upland sandpiper, Bartramia longicauda
- Bristle-thighed curlew, Numenius tahitiensis
- Hudsonian whimbrel, Numenius hudsonicus
- Little curlew, Numenius minutus (A)
- Eskimo curlew, Numenius borealis (A) (Not seen since 1986)
- Long-billed curlew, Numenius americanus (C)
- Far Eastern curlew, Numenius madagascariensis (C)
- Bar-tailed godwit, Limosa lapponica
- Black-tailed godwit, Limosa limosa (C)
- Hudsonian godwit, Limosa haemastica
- Marbled godwit, Limosa fedoa
- Ruddy turnstone, Arenaria interpres
- Black turnstone, Arenaria melanocephala
- Great knot, Calidris tenuirostris (C)
- Red knot, Calidris canutus
- Surfbird, Calidris virgata
- Ruff, Calidris pugnax (R)
- Broad-billed sandpiper, Calidris falcinellus (C)
- Sharp-tailed sandpiper, Calidris acuminata
- Stilt sandpiper, Calidris himantopus
- Curlew sandpiper, Calidris ferruginea (C)
- Temminck's stint, Calidris temminckii (C)
- Long-toed stint, Calidris subminuta (R)
- Spoon-billed sandpiper. Calidris pygmea (C)
- Red-necked stint, Calidris ruficollis
- Sanderling, Calidris alba
- Dunlin, Calidris alpina
- Rock sandpiper, Calidris ptilocnemis
- Purple sandpiper. Calidris maritima (A)
- Baird's sandpiper, Calidris bairdii
- Little stint, Calidris minuta (C)
- Least sandpiper, Calidris minutilla
- White-rumped sandpiper, Calidris fuscicollis (R)
- Buff-breasted sandpiper, Calidris subruficollis
- Pectoral sandpiper, Calidris melanotos
- Semipalmated sandpiper, Calidris pusilla
- Western sandpiper, Calidris mauri
- Short-billed dowitcher, Limnodromus griseus
- Long-billed dowitcher, Limnodromus scolopaceus
- Jack snipe, Lymnocryptes minimus (C)
- Solitary snipe, Gallinago solitaria (C)
- Pin-tailed snipe, Gallinago stenura (C)
- Common snipe, Gallinago gallinago
- Wilson's snipe, Gallinago delicata
- Terek sandpiper, Xenus cinereus (C)
- Common sandpiper, Actitis hypoleucos (R)
- Spotted sandpiper, Actitis macularia
- Green sandpiper, Tringa ochropus (C)
- Solitary sandpiper, Tringa solitaria
- Gray-tailed tattler, Tringa brevipes
- Wandering tattler, Tringa incana
- Lesser yellowlegs, Tringa flavipes
- Willet, Tringa semipalmata (C)
- Spotted redshank, Tringa erythropus (C)
- Common greenshank, Tringa nebularia (R)
- Greater yellowlegs, Tringa melanoleuca
- Wood sandpiper, Tringa glareola
- Marsh sandpiper, Tringa stagnatilis (C)
- Wilson's phalarope, Phalaropus tricolor (R)
- Red-necked phalarope, Phalaropus lobatus
- Red phalarope, Phalaropus fulicarius

== Pratincoles and coursers ==
Order: Charadriiformes Family: Glareolidae

Pratincoles have short legs, very long pointed wings, and long forked tails. Their most unusual feature for birds classed as waders is that they typically hunt their insect prey on the wing like swallows, although they can also feed on the ground. Their short bills are an adaptation to aerial feeding.

- Oriental pratincole, Glareola maldivarum (A)

== Skuas and jaegers ==
Order: Charadriiformes Family: Stercorariidae

Jaegers and skuas are in general medium to large birds, typically with gray or brown plumage, often with white markings on the wings. They have longish bills with hooked tips and webbed feet with sharp claws. They look like large dark gulls, but have a fleshy cere above the upper mandible. They are strong, acrobatic fliers.

- South polar skua, Stercorarius maccormicki (C)
- Pomarine jaeger, Stercorarius pomarinus
- Parasitic jaeger, Stercorarius parasiticus
- Long-tailed jaeger, Stercorarius longicaudus

== Auks, murres, and puffins ==
Order: Charadriiformes Family: Alcidae

The family Alcidae includes auks, murres, and puffins. These are short-winged birds that live on the open sea and normally only come ashore for breeding.

- Dovekie, Alle alle (R)
- Common murre, Uria aalge
- Thick-billed murre, Uria lomvia
- Black guillemot, Cepphus grylle
- Pigeon guillemot, Cepphus columba
- Long-billed murrelet, Brachyramphus perdix (C)
- Marbled murrelet, Brachyramphus marmoratus
- Kittlitz's murrelet, Brachyramphus brevirostris
- Ancient murrelet, Synthliboarmphus antiquus
- Cassin's auklet, Ptychoramphus aleuticus
- Parakeet auklet, Aethia psittacula
- Least auklet, Aethia pusilla
- Whiskered auklet, Aethia pygmaea
- Crested auklet, Aethia cristatella
- Rhinoceros auklet, Cerorhinca monocerata
- Horned puffin, Fratercula corniculata
- Tufted puffin, Fratercula cirrhata

== Gulls, terns, and skimmers ==
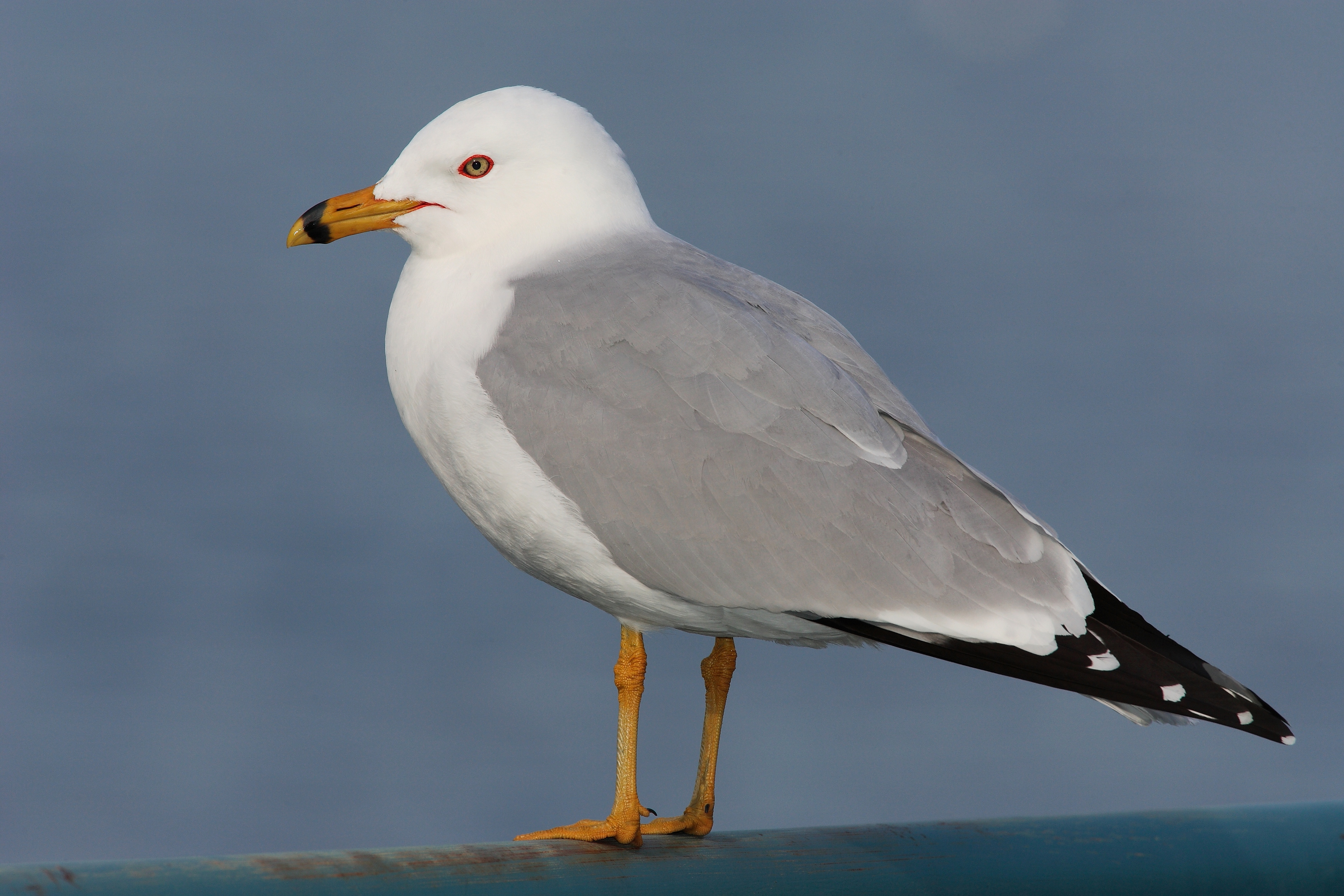
Ring-billed gull

Order: Charadriiformes Family: Laridae

Laridae is a family of medium to large seabirds and includes gulls, terns, kittiwakes, and skimmers. They are typically gray or white, often with black markings on the head or wings. They have stout, longish bills and webbed feet.

- Black-legged kittiwake, Rissa tridactyla
- Red-legged kittiwake, Rissa brevirostris
- Ivory gull, Pagophila eburnea
- Sabine's gull, Xema sabini
- Bonaparte's gull, Chroicocephalus philadelphia
- Black-headed gull, Chroicocephalus ridibundus (R)
- Little gull, Hydrocoleus minutus (C)
- Ross's gull, Rhodostethia rosea
- Laughing gull, Leucophaeus atricilla (C)
- Franklin's gull, Leucophaeus pipixcan (R)
- Pallas's gull, Ichthyaetus ichthyaetus (A)
- Black-tailed gull, Larus crassirostris (C)
- Heermann's gull, Larus heermanni (C)
- Common gull, Larus canus (R)
- Short-billed gull, Larus brachyrhynchus
- Ring-billed gull, Larus delawarensis (R)
- Western gull, Larus occidentalis (C)
- California gull, Larus californicus
- American herring gull, Larus smithsonianus
- Vega gull, Larus vegae (R)
- Iceland gull, Larus glaucoides
- Lesser black-backed gull, Larus fuscus (C)
- Slaty-backed gull, Larus schistisagus
- Glaucous-winged gull, Larus glaucescens
- Glaucous gull, Larus hyperboreus
- Great black-backed gull, Larus marinus (C)
- Sooty tern, Onychoprion fuscatus (A)
- Aleutian tern, Onychoprion aleuticus
- Little tern/Least tern, Sternula albifrons/antillarum (U)
- Caspian tern, Hydroprogne caspia (R)
- Black tern, Chlidonias niger (C)
- White-winged tern, Chlidonias leucopterus (C)
- Common tern, Sterna hirundo (C)
- Arctic tern, Sterna paradisaea
- Sandwich tern, Thalasseus sandvicensis (A)

== Loons ==
Order: Gaviiformes Family: Gaviidae

Loons are aquatic birds the size of a large duck, to which they are unrelated. Their plumage is largely gray or black, and they have spear-shaped bills. Loons swim well and fly adequately, but are almost hopeless on land, because their legs are placed towards the rear of the body.

- Red-throated loon, Gavia stellata
- Arctic loon, Gavia arctica (R)
- Pacific loon, Gavia pacifica
- Common loon, Gavia immer
- Yellow-billed loon, Gavia adamsii

== Albatrosses ==
Order: Procellariiformes Family: Diomedeidae

The albatrosses are amongst the largest of flying birds, and the great albatrosses from the genus Diomedea have the largest wingspans of any extant birds.

- Salvin's albatross, Thalassarche salvini (A)
- Laysan albatross, Phoebastria immutabilis
- Black-footed albatross, Phoebastria nigripes
- Short-tailed albatross, Phoebastria albatrus (R)

== Northern storm-petrels ==
Order: Procellariiformes Family: Hydrobatidae

The storm-petrels are the smallest seabirds, relatives of the petrels, feeding on planktonic crustaceans and small fish picked from the surface, typically while hovering. The flight is fluttering and sometimes bat-like.

- Fork-tailed storm-petrel, Hydrobates furcatus
- Swinhoe's storm-petrel, Hydrobates monorhis (U)
- Leach's storm-petrel, Hydrobates leucorhous

== Shearwaters and petrels ==
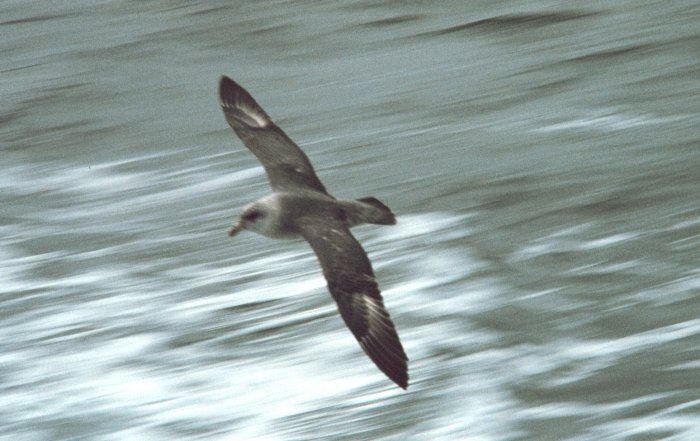
Northern fulmar

Order: Procellariiformes Family: Procellariidae

The procellariids are the main group of medium-sized "true petrels", characterized by united nostrils with medium septum and a long outer functional primary.

- Northern fulmar, Fulmarus glacialis
- Providence petrel, Pterodroma solandri (A)
- Murphy's petrel, Pterodroma ultima (U)
- Mottled petrel, Pterodroma inexpectata
- Cook's petrel, Pterodroma cookii (A)
- Buller's shearwater, Ardenna bulleri
- Short-tailed shearwater, Ardenna tenuirostris
- Sooty shearwater, Ardenna griseus
- Great shearwater, Ardenna gravis (C)
- Pink-footed shearwater, Ardenna creatopus (R)
- Flesh-footed shearwater, Ardenna carneipes (R)
- Manx shearwater, Puffinus puffinus (R)

== Frigatebirds ==
Order: Suliformes Family: Fregatidae

Frigatebirds are large seabirds usually found over tropical oceans. They are large, black, or black-and-white, with long wings and deeply forked tails. The males have colored inflatable throat pouches. They do not swim or walk and cannot take off from a flat surface. Having the largest wingspan-to-body-weight ratio of any bird, they are essentially aerial, able to stay aloft for more than a week.

- Magnificent frigatebird, Fregata magnificens (A)

== Boobies and gannets ==
Order: Suliformes Family: Sulidae

The sulids comprise the gannets and boobies. Both groups are medium to large coastal seabirds that plunge-dive for fish.

- Nazca booby, Sula granti (A)
- Brown booby, Sula leucogaster (C)
- Red-footed booby, Sula sula (C)
- Northern gannet, Morus bassanus (U)

== Cormorants and shags ==
Order: Suliformes Family: Phalacrocoracidae

Cormorants are medium-to-large aquatic birds, usually with mainly dark plumage and areas of colored skin on the face. The bill is long, thin, and sharply hooked. Their feet are four-toed and webbed.

- Brandt's cormorant, Urile penicillatus (R)
- Red-faced cormorant, Urile urile
- Pelagic cormorant, Urile pelagicus
- Double-crested cormorant, Nannopterum auritum

== Pelicans ==
Order: Pelecaniformes Family: Pelecanidae

Pelicans are very large water birds with a distinctive pouch under their beak. Like other birds in the order Pelecaniformes, they have four webbed toes.

- American white pelican, Pelecanus erythrorhynchos (A)
- Brown pelican, Pelecanus occidentalis (C)

== Herons, egrets, and bitterns ==
Order: Pelecaniformes Family: Ardeidae

The family Ardeidae contains the herons, egrets, and bitterns. Herons and egrets are medium to large wading birds with long necks and legs. Bitterns tend to be shorter necked and more secretive. Members of Ardeidae fly with their necks retracted, unlike other long-necked birds such as storks, ibises, and spoonbills.

- American bittern, Botaurus lentiginosus (C)
- Eurasian bittern, Botaurus stellaris (U) (This species is not on the AOS Check-list)
- Yellow bittern, Ixobrychus sinensis (A)
- Great blue heron, Ardea herodias
- Gray heron, Ardea cinerea (C)
- Great egret, Ardea alba (C)
- Intermediate egret, Ardea intermedia (A)
- Chinese egret, Egretta eulophotes (A)
- Little egret, Egretta garzetta (A)
- Snowy egret, Egretta thula (U)
- Tricolored heron, Egretta tricolor (A)
- Cattle egret, Bubulcus ibis (C)
- Chinese pond-heron, Ardeola bacchus (C)
- Green heron, Butorides virescens (A)
- Black-crowned night-heron, Nycticorax nycticorax (C)

== Ibises and spoonbills ==
Order: Pelecaniformes Family: Threskiornithidae

The family Threskiornithidae includes the ibises and spoonbills. They have long, broad wings. Their bodies are elongated, the neck more so, with long legs. The bill is also long, curved downward in the ibises, straight and markedly flattened in the spoonbills.

- White-faced ibis, Plegadis chihi (A)

== New World vultures ==
Order: Cathartiformes Family: Cathartidae

The New World vultures are not closely related to Old World vultures, but superficially resemble them because of convergent evolution. Like the Old World vultures, they are scavengers, however, unlike Old World vultures, which find carcasses by sight, New World vultures have a good sense of smell with which they locate carcasses.

- Turkey vulture, Cathartes aura (C)

== Osprey ==
Order: Accipitriformes Family: Pandionidae

Pandionidae is a monotypic family of fish-eating birds of prey. Its single species possesses a very large and powerful hooked beak, strong legs, strong talons, and keen eyesight.

- Osprey, Pandion haliaetus

== Hawks, eagles, and kites ==
Order: Accipitriformes Family: Accipitridae

Accipitridae is a family of birds of prey, which includes hawks, eagles, kites, harriers, and Old World vultures. These birds have very large powerful hooked beaks for tearing flesh from their prey, strong legs, powerful talons, and keen eyesight.

- Crested honey buzzard, Pernis ptilorhynchus (This species is not on the AOS Check-list)
- Golden eagle, Aquila chrysaetos
- Northern harrier, Circus hudsonius
- Chinese sparrowhawk, Accipiter soloensis (U)
- Eurasian sparrowhawk, Accipiter nisus (U) (This species is not on the AOS Check-list)
- Sharp-shinned hawk, Accipiter striatus
- Cooper's hawk, Accipiter cooperii (U)
- Eurasian goshawk, Accipiter gentilis (A)
- American goshawk, Accipiter atricapillus
- Black kite, Milvus migrans (A)
- Bald eagle, Haliaeetus leucocephalus
- White-tailed eagle, Haliaeetus albicilla (C)
- Steller's sea-eagle, Haliaeetus pelagicus (C)
- Swainson's hawk, Buteo swainsoni (R)
- Red-tailed hawk, Buteo jamaicensis
- Rough-legged hawk, Buteo lagopus
- Long-legged buzzard, Buteo rufinus (A)

== Owls ==
Order: Strigiformes Family: Strigidae

Typical owls are small to large solitary nocturnal birds of prey. They have large forward-facing eyes and ears, a hawk-like beak, and a conspicuous circle of feathers around each eye called a facial disk.

- Oriental scops-owl, Otus sunia (A)
- Western screech-owl, Megascops kennicottii (R)
- Great horned owl, Bubo virginianus
- Snowy owl, Bubo scandiacus
- Northern hawk owl, Surnia ulula
- Northern pygmy-owl, Glaucidium gnoma (R)
- Barred owl, Strix varia
- Great gray owl, Strix nebulosa
- Long-eared owl, Asio otus (C)
- Short-eared owl, Asio flammeus
- Boreal owl, Aegolius funereus
- Northern saw-whet owl, Aegolius acadicus
- Northern boobook, Ninox japonica (A)

== Hoopoes ==
Order: Upupiformes Family: Upupidae

This black, white and pink bird is quite unmistakable, especially in its erratic flight, which is like that of a giant butterfly. It is the only member of its family. The song is a trisyllabic oop-oop-oop, which gives rise to its English and scientific names.

- Eurasian hoopoe, Upupa epops (A)

== Kingfishers ==
Order: Coraciiformes Family: Alcedinidae

Kingfishers are medium-sized birds with large heads, long, pointed bills, short legs, and stubby tails.

- Ringed kingfisher, Megaceryle torquata (A)
- Belted kingfisher, Megaceryle alcyon

== Woodpeckers ==
Order: Piciformes Family: Picidae

Woodpeckers are small to medium-sized birds with chisel-like beaks, short legs, stiff tails, and long tongues used for capturing insects. Some species have feet with two toes pointing forward and two backward, while several species have only three toes. Many woodpeckers have the habit of tapping noisily on tree trunks with their beaks.

- Eurasian wryneck, Jynx torquilla (C)
- Lewis's woodpecker, Melanerpes lewis (A)
- Yellow-bellied sapsucker, Sphyrapicus varius (R)
- Red-breasted sapsucker, Sphyrapicus ruber
- American three-toed woodpecker, Picoides dorsalis
- Black-backed woodpecker, Picoides arcticus
- Great spotted woodpecker, Dendrocopos major (C)
- Downy woodpecker, Dryobates pubescens
- Hairy woodpecker, Dryobates villosus
- Northern flicker, Colaptes auratus
- Pileated woodpecker, Dryocopus pileatus (U)

== Falcons and caracaras ==
Order: Falconiformes Family: Falconidae

Falconidae is a family of diurnal birds of prey, notably the falcons and caracaras. They differ from hawks, eagles, and kites in that they kill with their beaks instead of their talons.

- Eurasian kestrel, Falco tinnunculus (C)
- American kestrel, Falco sparverius
- Merlin, Falco columbarius
- Eurasian hobby, Falco subbuteo (C)
- Gyrfalcon, Falco rusticolus
- Peregrine falcon, Falco peregrinus

== Tyrant flycatchers ==
Order: Passeriformes Family: Tyrannidae

Tyrant flycatchers are Passerine birds which occur throughout North and South America. They superficially resemble the Old World flycatchers, but are more robust and have stronger bills. They do not have the sophisticated vocal capabilities of the songbirds. Most, but not all, are rather plain. As the name implies, most are insectivorous.

- Ash-throated flycatcher, Myiarchus cinerascens (A)
- Great crested flycatcher, Myiarchus crinitus (C)
- Tropical kingbird, Tyrannus melancholicus (C)
- Western kingbird, Tyrannus verticalis (C)
- Eastern kingbird, Tyrannus tyrannus (C)
- Scissor-tailed flycatcher, Tyrannus forficatus (C)
- Olive-sided flycatcher, Contopus cooperi
- Western wood-pewee, Contopus sordidulus
- Yellow-bellied flycatcher, Empidonax flaviventris (R)
- Alder flycatcher, Empidonax alnorum
- Willow flycatcher, Empidonax traillii (C)
- Least flycatcher, Empidonax minimus (R)
- Hammond's flycatcher, Empidonax hammondii
- Dusky flycatcher, Empidonax oberholseri (C)
- Western flycatcher, Empidonax difficilis
- Black phoebe, Sayornis nigricans (A)
- Eastern phoebe, Sayornis phoebe (C)
- Say's phoebe, Sayornis saya

== Vireos, shrike-babblers, and erpornis ==
Order: Passeriformes Family: Vireonidae

The vireos are a group of small to medium-sized passerine birds. They are typically greenish in color and resemble wood warblers apart from their heavier bills.

- Cassin's vireo, Vireo cassinii (R)
- Blue-headed vireo, Vireo solitarius (A)
- Philadelphia vireo, Vireo philadelphicus (C)
- Warbling vireo, Vireo gilvus
- Red-eyed vireo, Vireo olivaceus (C)

== Shrikes ==
Order: Passeriformes Family: Laniidae

Shrikes are passerine birds known for their habit of catching other birds and small animals and impaling the uneaten portions of their bodies on thorns. A shrike's beak is hooked, like that of a typical bird of prey.

- Brown shrike, Lanius cristatus (C)
- Red-backed shrike, Lanius collurio (A)
- Great gray shrike, Lanius excubitor (A) (This species is not on the AOS Check-list)
- Northern shrike, Lanius borealis

== Crows, jays, and magpies ==
Order: Passeriformes Family: Corvidae

The family Corvidae includes crows, ravens, jays, choughs, magpies, treepies, nutcrackers, and ground jays. Corvids are above average in size among the Passeriformes, and some of the larger species show high levels of intelligence.

- Canada jay, Perisoreus canadensis
- Steller's jay, Cyanocitta stelleri
- Clark's nutcracker, Nucifraga columbiana (C)
- Black-billed magpie, Pica hudsonia
- American crow, Corvus brachyrhynchos
- Common raven, Corvus corax

== Tits, chickadees, and titmice ==
Order: Passeriformes Family: Paridae

The Paridae are mainly small stocky woodland species with short stout bills. Some have crests. They are adaptable birds, with a mixed diet including seeds and insects.

- Black-capped chickadee, Poecile atricapilla
- Mountain chickadee, Poecile gambeli (C)
- Chestnut-backed chickadee, Poecile rufescens
- Boreal chickadee, Poecile hudsonica
- Gray-headed chickadee, Poecile cinctus
- Great tit, Parus major (U) (This species is not on the AOS Check-list)

== Larks ==
Order: Passeriformes Family: Alaudidae

Larks are small terrestrial birds with often extravagant songs and display flights. Most larks are fairly dull in appearance. Their food is insects and seeds.

- Eurasian skylark, Alauda arvensis (R)
- Horned lark, Eremophila alpestris

== Reed warblers and allies ==
Order: Passeriformes Family: Acrocephalidae

The members of this family are usually rather large for "warblers". Most are rather plain olivaceous brown above with much yellow to beige below. They are usually found in open woodland, reedbeds, or tall grass. The family occurs mostly in southern to western Eurasia and surroundings, but also ranges far into the Pacific, with some species in Africa.

- Thick-billed warbler, Arundinax aedon (A)
- Sedge warbler, Acrocephalus schoenobaenus (A)
- Icterine warbler, Acrocephalus icterina (A)
- Blyth's reed warbler, Acrocephalus dumetorum (A)

== Grassbirds and allies ==
Order: Passeriformes Family: Locustellidae

Locustellidae are a family of small insectivorous songbirds found mainly in Eurasia, Africa, and the Australian region. They are smallish birds with tails that are usually long and pointed, and tend to be drab brownish or buffy all over.

- Pallas's grasshopper warbler, Helopsaltes certhiola (A)
- Middendorff's grasshopper warbler, Helosaltes ochotensis (C)
- Lanceolated warbler, Locustella lanceolata (C)
- River warbler, Locustella fluviatilis (A)

== Swallows ==
Order: Passeriformes Family: Hirundinidae

The family Hirundinidae is a group of passerines characterized by their adaptation to aerial feeding. These adaptations include a slender streamlined body, long pointed wings, and short bills with a wide gape. The feet are adapted to perching rather than walking, and the front toes are partially joined at the base.

- Bank swallow, Riparia riparia
- Tree swallow, Tachycineta bicolor
- Violet-green swallow, Tachycineta thalassina
- Northern rough-winged swallow, Stelgidopteryx serripennis (R)
- Purple martin, Progne subis (C)
- Barn swallow, Hirundo rustica
- Cliff swallow, Petrochelidon pyrrhonota
- Common house-martin, Delichon urbicum (C)

== Leaf warblers ==
Order: Passeriformes Family: Phylloscopidae

Leaf warblers are a family of small insectivorous birds found mostly in Eurasia and ranging into Wallacea and Africa. The Arctic warbler breeds east into Alaska. The species are of various sizes, often green-plumaged above and yellow below, or more subdued with grayish-green to grayish-brown colors.

- Willow warbler, Phylloscopus trochilus (C)
- Common chiffchaff, Phylloscopus collybita (C)
- Wood warbler, Phylloscopus sibilatrix (C)
- Dusky warbler, Phylloscopus fuscatus (C)
- Pallas's leaf warbler, Phylloscopus proregulus (A)
- Yellow-browed warbler, Phylloscopus inornatus (C)
- Arctic warbler, Phylloscopus borealis
- Kamchatka leaf warbler, Phylloscopus examinandus (C)

== Sylviid Warblers, parrotbills, and allies ==
Order: Passeriformes Family: Sylviidae

The family Sylviidae is a group of small insectivorous passerine birds. They mainly occur as breeding species, as the common name implies, in Europe, Asia, and, to a lesser extent, Africa. Most are of generally undistinguished appearance, but many have distinctive songs.

- Lesser whitethroat, Sylvia curruca (A)

== Kinglets ==
Order: Passeriformes Family: Regulidae

The kinglets are a small family of birds which resemble the titmice. They are very small insectivorous birds. The adults have colored crowns, giving rise to their names.

- Ruby-crowned kinglet, Corthylio calendula
- Golden-crowned kinglet, Regulus satrapa

== Waxwings ==
Order: Passeriformes Family: Bombycillidae

The waxwings are a group of birds with soft silky plumage and unique red tips to some of the wing feathers. In the Bohemian and cedar waxwings, these tips look like sealing wax and give the group its name. These are arboreal birds of northern forests. They live on insects in summer and berries in winter.

- Bohemian waxwing, Bombycilla garrulus
- Cedar waxwing, Bombycilla cedrorum

== Nuthatches ==
Order: Passeriformes Family: Sittidae

Nuthatches are small woodland birds. They have the unusual ability to climb down trees head first, unlike other birds which can only go upwards. Nuthatches have big heads, short tails, and powerful bills and feet.

- Red-breasted nuthatch, Sitta canadensis

== Treecreepers ==
Order: Passeriformes Family: Certhiidae

Treecreepers are small woodland birds, brown above and white below. They have thin pointed down-curved bills, which they use to extricate insects from bark. They have stiff tail feathers, like woodpeckers, which they use to support themselves on vertical trees.

- Brown creeper, Certhia americana

== Wrens ==
Order: Passeriformes Family: Troglodytidae

Wrens are small and inconspicuous birds, except for their loud songs. They have short wings and thin down-turned bills. Several species often hold their tails upright.

- Rock wren, Salpinctes obsoletus (A)
- Pacific wren, Troglodytes pacificus
- Marsh wren, Cistothorus palustris (A)

== Mockingbirds and thrashers ==
Order: Passeriformes Family: Mimidae

The mimids are a family of passerine birds which includes thrashers, mockingbirds, tremblers, and the New World catbirds. These birds are notable for their vocalization, especially their remarkable ability to mimic a wide variety of birds and other sounds heard outdoors. The species tend towards dull grays and browns in their appearance.

- Gray catbird, Dumetella carolinensis (C)
- Brown thrasher, Toxostoma rufum (C)
- Northern mockingbird, Mimus polyglottos (C)

== Starlings ==
Order: Passeriformes Family: Sturnidae

Starlings are small to medium-sized passerine birds. They are medium-sized passerines with strong feet. Their flight is strong and direct and they are very gregarious. Their preferred habitat is fairly open country, and they eat insects and fruit. Plumage is typically dark with a metallic sheen.

- European starling, Sturnus vulgaris (Introduced to North America)

== Dippers ==
Order: Passeriformes Family: Cinclidae

Dippers are small, stout, birds that feed in cold, fast moving streams.

- American dipper, Cinclus mexicanus

== Thrushes and allies ==
Order: Passeriformes Family: Turdidae

The thrushes are a group of passerine birds that occur mainly but not exclusively in the Old World. They are plump, soft plumaged, small to medium-sized insectivores or sometimes omnivores, often feeding on the ground. Many have attractive songs.

- Mountain bluebird, Sialia currucoides (R)
- Townsend's solitaire, Myadestes townsendi
- Veery, Catharus fuscescens (C)
- Gray-cheeked thrush, Catharus minimus
- Swainson's thrush, Catharus ustulatus
- Hermit thrush, Catharus guttatus
- Wood thrush, Hylocichla mustelina (A)
- Eyebrowed thrush, Turdus obscurus (R)
- Dusky thrush, Turdus eunomus (C)
- Naumann's thrush, Turdus naumanni (U)
- Fieldfare, Turdus pilaris (A)
- Redwing, Turdus iliacus (A)
- Song thrush, Turdys philomelos (A)
- American robin, Turdus migratorius
- Varied thrush, Ixoreus naevius

== Old World flycatchers ==
Order: Passeriformes Family: Muscicapidae

This a large family of small passerine birds restricted to the Old World. Most of the species below only occur in North America as vagrants. The appearance of these birds is highly varied, but they mostly have weak songs and harsh calls.

- Gray-streaked flycatcher, Muscicapa griseisticta (C)
- Asian brown flycatcher, Muscicapa dauurica (C)
- Spotted flycatcher, Muscicapa striata (A)
- Dark-sided flycatcher, Muscicapa sibirica (C)
- Siberian blue robin, Larvivora cyane (A)
- Rufous-tailed robin, Larvivora sibilans (C)
- Bluethroat, Cyanecula svecica
- Siberian rubythroat, Calliope calliope (R)
- Red-flanked bluetail, Tarsiger cyanurus (C)
- Narcissus flycatcher, Ficedula narcissina (A)
- Mugimaki flycatcher, Ficedula mugimaki (U)
- Taiga flycatcher, Ficedula albicilla (C)
- Common redstart, Phoenicurus phoenicurus (A)
- Stonechat, Saxicola maurus (C)
- Rufous-tailed rock-thrush, Monticola saxatilis (A)
- Northern wheatear, Oenanthe oenanthe
- Pied wheatear, Oenanthe pleschanka (A)

== Accentors ==
Order: Passeriformes Family: Prunellidae

The accentors are small, fairly drab birds with thin sharp bills superficially similar, but unrelated to, sparrows. They are endemic to the Palearctic and only appear in North America as a vagrant.

- Siberian accentor, Prunella montanella (C)

== Old World sparrows ==
Order: Passeriformes Family: Passeridae

Old World sparrows are small passerine birds. In general, sparrows tend to be small plump brownish or grayish birds with short tails and short powerful beaks. Sparrows are seed eaters, but they also consume small insects.

- House sparrow, Passer domesticus (C) (Introduced to North America)

== Wagtails and pipits ==
Order: Passeriformes Family: Motacillidae

Motacillidae is a family of small passerine birds with medium to long tails. They include the wagtails, longclaws, and pipits. They are slender ground-feeding insectivores of open country.

- Eastern yellow wagtail, Motacilla tschutschensis
- Gray wagtail, Motacilla cinerea (C)
- White wagtail, Motacilla alba (R)
- Tree pipit, Anthus trivialis (C)
- Olive-backed pipit, Anthus hodgsoni (C)
- Pechora pipit, Anthus gustavi (C)
- Red-throated pipit, Anthus cervinus
- American pipit, Anthus rubescens

== Finches, euphonias, and allies ==
Order: Passeriformes Family: Fringillidae

Finches are seed-eating passerine birds, that are small to moderately large and have a strong beak, usually conical and in some species very large. All have twelve tail feathers and nine primaries. These birds have a bouncing flight with alternating bouts of flapping and gliding on closed wings, and most sing well.

- Brambling, Fringilla montifringilla
- Evening grosbeak, Coccothraustes vespertinus (C)
- Hawfinch, Coccothraustes coccothraustes (C)
- Common rosefinch, Carpodacus erythrinus (C)
- Pallas's rosefinch, Carpodacus roseus (A)
- Pine grosbeak, Pinicola enucleator
- Eurasian bullfinch, Pyrrhula pyrrhula (C)
- Asian rosy-finch, Leucosticte tephrocotis (A)
- Gray-crowned rosy-finch, Leucosticte tephrocotis
- House finch, Haemorhous mexicanus (C)
- Purple finch, Haemorhous purpureus (R)
- Cassin's finch, Haemorhous cassinii (C)
- Oriental greenfinch, Chloris sinica (C)
- Common redpoll, Acanthis flammea
- Hoary redpoll, Acanthis hornemanni
- Parrot crossbill, Loxia pytyopsittacus (A) (This species is not on the AOS Check-list)
- Red crossbill, Loxia curvirostra
- White-winged crossbill, Loxia leucoptera
- Eurasian siskin, Spinus spinus (C)
- Pine siskin, Spinus pinus
- American goldfinch, Spinus tristis (C)

== Longspurs and snow buntings ==
Order: Passeriformes Family: Calcariidae

The Calcariidae are a group of passerine birds that had been traditionally grouped with the New World sparrows, but differ in a number of respects and are usually found in open grassy areas.

- Lapland longspur, Calcarius lapponicus
- Chestnut-collared longspur, Calcarius ornatus (U)
- Smith's longspur, Calcarius pictus
- Snow bunting, Plectrophenax nivalis
- McKay's bunting, Plectrophenax hyperboreus (En)

== Old World buntings ==
Order: Passeriformes Family: Emberizidae

Emberizidae is a family of passerine birds containing a single genus. Until 2017, the New World sparrows (Passerellidae) were also considered part of this family.

- Pine bunting, Emberiza leucocephalos (C)
- Yellow-browed bunting, Emberiza chrysophrys (A)
- Little bunting, Emberiza pusilla (C)
- Rustic bunting, Emberiza rustica (R)
- Yellow-throated bunting, Emberiza elegans (A)
- Yellow-breasted bunting, Emberiza aureola (C)
- Gray bunting, Emberiza variabilis (C)
- Pallas's bunting, Emberiza pallasi (C)
- Reed bunting. Emberiza schoeniclus (C)

== New World sparrows ==
Order: Passeriformes Family: Passerellidae

Until 2017, these species were considered part of the family Emberizidae. Most of the species are known as sparrows, but these birds are not closely related to the Old World sparrows which are in the family Passeridae. Many of these have distinctive head patterns.

- Lark sparrow, Chondestes grammacus (C)
- Chipping sparrow, Spizella passerina
- Clay-colored sparrow, Spizella pallida (C)
- Brewer's sparrow, Spizella breweri (R)
- Fox sparrow, Passerella iliaca
- American tree sparrow, Spizelloides arborea
- Dark-eyed junco, Junco hyemalis
- White-crowned sparrow, Zonotrichia leucophrys
- Golden-crowned sparrow, Zonotrichia atricapilla
- Harris's sparrow, Zonotrichia querula (C)
- White-throated sparrow, Zonotrichia albicollis (R)
- Vesper sparrow, Pooecetes gramineus (A)
- LeConte's sparrow, Ammospiza leconteii (A)
- Savannah sparrow, Passerculus sandwichensis
- Song sparrow, Melospiza melodia
- Lincoln's sparrow, Melospiza lincolnii
- Swamp sparrow, Melospiza georgiana (R)
- Spotted towhee, Pipilo maculatus (C)

== Troupials and allies ==
Order: Passeriformes Family: Icteridae

The icterids are a group of small to medium-sized, often colorful passerine birds restricted to the New World and include the grackles, New World blackbirds, and New World orioles. Most species have black as a predominant plumage color, often enlivened by yellow, orange, or red.

- Yellow-headed blackbird, Xanthocephalus xanthocephalus (C)
- Bobolink, Dolichonyx oryzivorus (C)
- Western meadowlark, Sturnella neglecta (C)
- Orchard oriole, Icterus spurius (A)
- Hooded oriole, Icterus cucullatus (A)
- Bullock's oriole, Icterus bullockii (C)
- Red-winged blackbird, Agelaius phoeniceus
- Brown-headed cowbird, Molothrus ater (R)
- Rusty blackbird, Euphagus carolinus
- Brewer's blackbird, Euphagus cyanocephalus (C)
- Common grackle, Quiscalus quiscula (C)

== New World warblers ==
Order: Passeriformes Family: Parulidae

The wood-warblers are a group of small often colorful passerine birds restricted to the New World. Most are arboreal, but some like the ovenbird and the two waterthrushes are more terrestrial. Most members of this family are insectivores.

- Ovenbird, Seiurus aurocapilla (C)
- Northern waterthrush, Parkesia noveboracensis
- Black-and-white warbler, Mniotilta varia (C)
- Tennessee warbler, Leiothlypis peregrina (R)
- Orange-crowned warbler, Leiothlypis celata
- Nashville warbler, Leiothlypis ruficapilla (C)
- MacGillivray's warbler, Geothlypis tolmiei
- Mourning warbler, Geothlypis philadelphia (C)
- Kentucky warbler, Geothlypis formosa (U)
- Common yellowthroat, Geothlypis trichas
- American redstart, Setophaga ruticilla
- Cape May warbler, Setophaga tigrina (C)
- Northern parula, Setophaga americana (A)
- Magnolia warbler, Setophaga magnolia (C)
- Bay-breasted warbler, Setophaga castanea (A)
- Yellow warbler, Setophaga petechia
- Chestnut-sided warbler, Setophaga pensylvanica (C)
- Blackpoll warbler, Setophaga striata
- Black-throated blue warbler, Setophaga caerulescens (A)
- Palm warbler, Setophaga palmarum (R)
- Yellow-rumped warbler, Setophaga coronata
- Yellow-throated warbler, Setophaga dominica (A)
- Prairie warbler, Setophaga discolor (A)
- Black-throated gray warbler, Setophaga nigrescens (C)
- Townsend's warbler, Setophaga townsendi
- Hermit warbler, Setophaga occidentalis (U)
- Black-throated green warbler, Setophaga virens (A)
- Canada warbler, Cardellina canadensis (A)
- Wilson's warbler, Cardellina pusilla

== Cardinals and allies ==
Order: Passeriformes Family: Cardinalidae

The cardinals are a family of robust seed-eating birds with strong bills. They are typically associated with open woodland. The sexes usually have distinct plumages.

- Scarlet tanager, Piranga olivacea (A)
- Western tanager, Piranga ludoviciana
- Rose-breasted grosbeak, Pheucticus ludovicianus (C)
- Black-headed grosbeak, Pheucticus melanocephalus (R)
- Blue grosbeak, Passerina caerulea (A)
- Lazuli bunting, Passerina amoena (C)
- Indigo bunting, Passerina cyanea (C)
- Dickcissel, Spiza americana (A)

== See also ==
- List of birds of Denali National Park and Preserve
- List of birds of Kenai Fjords National Park
- List of birds of the Aleutian Islands
- List of birds
- Lists of birds by region
- List of birds of North America
