= List of birds of Denali National Park and Preserve =

This is a comprehensive listing of the bird species recorded in Denali National Park and Preserve, which is in the U.S. state of Alaska. Unless otherwise noted, this list is based on one published by the National Park Service (NPS) as of December 2007.

This list is presented in the taxonomic sequence of the Check-list of North and Middle American Birds, 7th edition through the 66th Supplement, published by the American Ornithological Society (AOS). Common and scientific names are also those of the Check-list, except that the common names of families are from the Clements taxonomy because the AOS list does not include them.

This list contains 183 species. Unless otherwise noted, all are considered to occur regularly in Denali National Park and Preserve as permanent residents, summer or winter visitors, or migrants. The following codes and definitions are used by the NPS checklist to annotate some species. When abundance varies by season, this list uses the code for the season of greatest abundance.

- (R) = Rare - "occurs regularly, but in small numbers" (20 species)
- (O) = Occasional - "has been recorded no more than a few times and is beyond the periphery of normal annual range" (15 species)
- (X) = Accidental - "has been recorded one or two times and is so far beyond the periphery of normal annual range that reoccurrence is unlikely" (15 species)
- (H) = Hypothetical - "No satisfactory records exist ... in Denali, but the species has either been recorded near the park and/or recorded within the park with some uncertainty" (17 species)

== Ducks, geese, and waterfowl ==
Order: Anseriformes Family: Anatidae

The family Anatidae includes the ducks and most duck-like waterfowl, such as geese and swans. These birds are adapted to an aquatic existence with webbed feet, bills which are flattened to a greater or lesser extent, and feathers that are excellent at shedding water due to special oils.

- Snow goose, Anser caerulescens
- Greater white-fronted goose, Anser albifrons
- Brant, Branta bernicla (X)
- Canada goose, Branta canadensis (R)
- Trumpeter swan, Cygnus buccinator
- Tundra swan, Cygnus columbianus
- Blue-winged teal, Spatula discors (R)
- Northern shoveler, Spatula clypeata
- Gadwall, Mareca strepera (O)
- Eurasian wigeon, Mareca penelope (O)
- American wigeon, Mareca americana
- Mallard, Anas platyrhynchos
- Northern pintail, Anas acuta
- Green-winged teal, Anas crecca
- Canvasback, Aythya valisineria (R)
- Redhead, Aythya americana (R)
- Ring-necked duck, Aythya collaris
- Greater scaup, Aythya marila
- Lesser scaup, Aythya affinis
- Harlequin duck, Histrionicus histrionicus
- Surf scoter, Melanitta perspicillata
- White-winged scoter, Melanitta deglandi
- Black scoter, Melanitta americana
- Long-tailed duck, Clangula hyemalis
- Bufflehead, Bucephala albeola
- Common goldeneye, Bucephala clangula
- Barrow's goldeneye, Bucephala islandica
- Hooded merganser, Lophodytes cucullatus (H)
- Common merganser, Mergus merganser (R)
- Red-breasted merganser, Mergus serrator
- Ruddy duck, Oxyura jamaicensis (H)

== Pheasants, grouse, and allies ==
Order: Galliformes Family: Phasianidae

Phasianidae consists of the pheasants and their allies. These are terrestrial species, variable in size but generally plump with broad relatively short wings. Many species are gamebirds or have been domesticated as a food source for humans.

- Ruffed grouse, Bonasa umbellus (R)
- Spruce grouse, Canachites canadensis
- Willow ptarmigan, Lagopus lagopus
- Rock ptarmigan, Lagopus muta
- White-tailed ptarmigan, Lagopus leucurus
- Sharp-tailed grouse, Tympanuchus phasianellus (H)

== Grebes ==
Order: Podicipediformes Family: Podicipedidae

Grebes are small to medium-large freshwater diving birds. They have lobed toes and are excellent swimmers and divers. However, they have their feet placed far back on the body, making them quite ungainly on land.

- Horned grebe, Podiceps auritus
- Red-necked grebe, Podiceps grisegena

== Pigeons and doves ==
Order: Columbiformes Family: Columbidae

Pigeons and doves are stout-bodied birds with short necks and short slender bills with a fleshy cere.

- Mourning dove, Zenaida macroura (H)

== Hummingbirds ==
Order: Apodiformes Family: Trochilidae

Hummingbirds are small birds capable of hovering in mid-air due to the rapid flapping of their wings. They are the only birds that can fly backwards.

- Rufous hummingbird, Selasphorus rufus (O)

== Cranes ==
Order: Gruiformes Family: Gruidae

Cranes are large, long-legged, and long-necked birds. Unlike the similar-looking but unrelated herons, cranes fly with necks outstretched, not pulled back. Most have elaborate and noisy courting displays or "dances".

- Sandhill crane, Antigone canadensis

== Plovers and lapwings ==
Order: Charadriiformes Family: Charadriidae

The family Charadriidae includes the plovers, dotterels, and lapwings. They are small to medium-sized birds with compact bodies, short thick necks, and long, usually pointed, wings. They are found in open country worldwide, mostly in habitats near water.

- Black-bellied plover, Pluvialis squatarola (O)
- American golden-plover, Pluvialis dominica
- Killdeer, Charadrius vociferus (O)
- Semipalmated plover, Charadrius semipalmatus

== Sandpipers and allies ==
Order: Charadriiformes Family: Scolopacidae

Scolopacidae is a large diverse family of small to medium-sized shorebirds including the sandpipers, curlews, godwits, shanks, tattlers, woodcocks, snipes, dowitchers, and phalaropes. The majority of these species eat small invertebrates picked out of the mud or soil. Different lengths of legs and bills enable multiple species to feed in the same habitat, particularly on the coast, without direct competition for food.

- Upland sandpiper, Bartramia longicauda
- Whimbrel, Numenius phaeopus
- Hudsonian godwit, Limosa haemastica (X)
- Ruddy turnstone, Arenaria interpres (X)
- Black turnstone, Arenaria melanocephala (X)
- Surfbird, Calidris virgata
- Sanderling, Calidris alba (X)
- Dunlin, Calidris alpina (R)
- Baird's sandpiper, Calidris bairdii
- Least sandpiper, Calidris minutilla
- Pectoral sandpiper, Calidris melanotos
- Semipalmated sandpiper, Calidris pusilla
- Western sandpiper, Calidris mauri (R)
- Short-billed dowitcher, Limnodromus griseus (H)
- Long-billed dowitcher, Limnodromus scolopaceus
- Wilson's snipe, Gallinago delicata
- Spotted sandpiper, Actitis macularia
- Solitary sandpiper, Tringa solitaria
- Wandering tattler, Tringa incana
- Lesser yellowlegs, Tringa flavipes
- Greater yellowlegs, Tringa melanoleuca
- Wilson's phalarope, Phalaropus tricolor (H)
- Red-necked phalarope, Phalaropus lobatus
- Red phalarope, Phalaropus fulicarius (X)

== Skuas and jaegers ==
Order: Charadriiformes Family: Stercorariidae

Jaegers and skuas are in general medium to large birds, typically with gray or brown plumage, often with white markings on the wings. They have longish bills with hooked tips and webbed feet with sharp claws. They look like large dark gulls, but have a fleshy cere above the upper mandible. They are strong, acrobatic fliers.

- Pomarine jaeger, Stercorarius pomarinus (X)
- Long-tailed jaeger, Stercorarius longicaudus

== Auks, murres, and puffins ==
Order: Charadriiformes Family: Alcidae

The family Alcidae includes auks, murres, and puffins. These are short-winged birds that live on the open sea and normally only come ashore for breeding.

- Long-billed murrelet, Brachyramphus perdix (X)

== Gulls, terns, and skimmers ==
Order: Charadriiformes Family: Laridae

Laridae is a family of medium to large seabirds and includes gulls, terns, kittiwakes, and skimmers. They are typically gray or white, often with black markings on the head or wings. They have stout, longish bills and webbed feet.

- Sabine's gull, Xema sabini (H)
- Bonaparte's gull, Chroicocephalus philadelphia
- Short-billed gull, Larus brachyrinchcus
- California gull, Larus californicus (H)
- Herring gull, Larus argentatus (R)
- Glaucous-winged gull, Larus glaucescens (R)
- Glaucous gull, Larus hyperboreus (H)
- Arctic tern, Sterna paradisaea

== Loons ==
Order: Gaviiformes Family: Gaviidae

Loons are aquatic birds the size of a large duck, to which they are unrelated. Their plumage is largely gray or black, and they have spear-shaped bills. Loons swim well and fly adequately, but are almost hopeless on land, because their legs are placed towards the rear of the body.

- Red-throated loon, Gavia stellata
- Pacific loon, Gavia pacifica (R)
- Common loon, Gavia immer
- Yellow-billed loon, Gavia adamsii (O)

== Osprey ==
Order: Accipitriformes Family: Pandionidae

Pandionidae is a monotypic family of fish-eating birds of prey. Its single species possesses a very large and powerful hooked beak, strong legs, strong talons, and keen eyesight.

- Osprey, Pandion haliaetus (R)

== Hawks, eagles, and kites ==
Order: Accipitriformes Family: Accipitridae

Accipitridae is a family of birds of prey, which includes hawks, eagles, kites, harriers, and Old World vultures. These birds have very large powerful hooked beaks for tearing flesh from their prey, strong legs, powerful talons, and keen eyesight.

- Golden eagle, Aquila chrysaetos
- Sharp-shinned hawk, Accipiter striatus
- American goshawk, Astur atricapillus
- Northern harrier, Circus hudsonius
- Bald eagle, Haliaeetus leucocephalus
- Swainson's hawk, Buteo swainsoni (O)
- Red-tailed hawk, Buteo jamaicensis
- Rough-legged hawk, Buteo lagopus

== Owls ==
Order: Strigiformes Family: Strigidae

Typical owls are small to large solitary nocturnal birds of prey. They have large forward-facing eyes and ears, a hawk-like beak, and a conspicuous circle of feathers around each eye called a facial disk.

- Great horned owl, Bubo virginianus
- Snowy owl, Bubo scandiacus (O)
- Northern hawk owl, Surnia ulula
- Great gray owl, Strix nebulosa (R)
- Short-eared owl, Asio flammeus
- Boreal owl, Aegolius funereus

== Kingfishers ==
Order: Coraciiformes Family: Alcedinidae

Kingfishers are medium-sized birds with large heads, long, pointed bills, short legs, and stubby tails.

- Belted kingfisher, Megaceryle alcyon

== Woodpeckers ==
Order: Piciformes Family: Picidae

Woodpeckers are small to medium-sized birds with chisel-like beaks, short legs, stiff tails, and long tongues used for capturing insects. Some species have feet with two toes pointing forward and two backward, while several species have only three toes. Many woodpeckers have the habit of tapping noisily on tree trunks with their beaks.

- American three-toed woodpecker, Picoides dorsalis
- Black-backed woodpecker, Picoides arcticus (O)
- Downy woodpecker, Dryobates pubescens (R)
- Hairy woodpecker, Dryobates villosus (R)
- Northern flicker, Colaptes auratus

== Falcons and caracaras ==
Order: Falconiformes Family: Falconidae

Falconidae is a family of diurnal birds of prey, notably the falcons and caracaras. They differ from hawks, eagles, and kites in that they kill with their beaks instead of their talons.

- American kestrel, Falco sparverius
- Merlin, Falco columbarius
- Gyrfalcon, Falco rusticolus
- Peregrine falcon, Falco peregrinus (R)

== Tyrant flycatchers ==
Order: Passeriformes Family: Tyrannidae

Tyrant flycatchers are Passerine birds which occur throughout North and South America. They superficially resemble the Old World flycatchers, but are more robust and have stronger bills. They do not have the sophisticated vocal capabilities of the songbirds. Most, but not all, are rather plain. As the name implies, most are insectivorous.

- Western kingbird, Tyrannus verticalis (H)
- Eastern kingbird, Tyrannus tyrannus (H)
- Olive-sided flycatcher, Contopus cooperi
- Western wood-pewee, Contopus sordidulus
- Yellow-bellied flycatcher, Empidonax flaviventris (X)
- Alder flycatcher, Empidonax alnorum
- Hammond's flycatcher, Empidonax hammondii (R)
- Black phoebe, Sayornis nigricans (X)
- Say's phoebe, Sayornis saya

== Vireos, shrike-babblers, and erpornis ==
Order: Passeriformes Family: Vireonidae

The vireos are a group of small to medium-sized passerine birds restricted to the New World. They are typically greenish in color and resemble wood-warblers apart from their heavier bills.

- Red-eyed vireo, Vireo olivaceus (X)

== Shrikes ==
Order: Passeriformes Family: Laniidae

Shrikes are passerine birds known for their habit of catching other birds and small animals and impaling the uneaten portions of their bodies on thorns. A shrike's beak is hooked, like that of a typical bird of prey.

- Northern shrike, Lanius borealis

== Crows, jays, and magpies ==
Order: Passeriformes Family: Corvidae

The family Corvidae includes crows, ravens, jays, choughs, magpies, treepies, nutcrackers, and ground jays. Corvids are above average in size among the Passeriformes, and some of the larger species show high levels of intelligence.

- Canada jay, Perisoreus canadensis
- Steller's jay, Cyanocitta stelleri (O)
- Black-billed magpie, Pica hudsonia
- Common raven, Corvus corax

== Tits, chickadees, and titmice ==
Order: Passeriformes Family: Paridae

The Paridae are mainly small stocky woodland species with short stout bills. Some have crests. They are adaptable birds, with a mixed diet including seeds and insects.

- Black-capped chickadee, Poecile atricapilla
- Boreal chickadee, Poecile hudsonica
- Gray-headed chickadee, Poecile cinctus (H)

== Larks ==
Order: Passeriformes Family: Alaudidae

Larks are small terrestrial birds with often extravagant songs and display flights. Most larks are fairly dull in appearance. Their food is insects and seeds.

- Horned lark, Eremophila alpestris

== Swallows ==
Order: Passeriformes Family: Hirundinidae

The family Hirundinidae is a group of passerines characterized by their adaptation to aerial feeding. These adaptations include a slender streamlined body, long pointed wings, and short bills with a wide gape. The feet are adapted to perching rather than walking, and the front toes are partially joined at the base.

- Bank swallow, Riparia riparia
- Tree swallow, Tachycineta bicolor
- Violet-green swallow, Tachycineta thalassina
- Barn swallow, Hirundo rustica (R)
- Cliff swallow, Petrochelidon pyrrhonota

== Leaf warblers ==
Order: Passeriformes Family: Phylloscopidae

Leaf warblers are a family of small insectivorous birds found mostly in Eurasia and ranging into Wallacea and Africa. The Arctic warbler breeds east into Alaska. The species are of various sizes, often green-plumaged above and yellow below, or more subdued with grayish-green to grayish-brown colors.

- Arctic warbler, Phylloscopus borealis

== Kinglets ==
Order: Passeriformes Family: Regulidae

The kinglets are a small family of birds which resemble the titmice. They are very small insectivorous birds in the genus Regulus. The adults have colored crowns, giving rise to their names.

- Ruby-crowned kinglet, Corthylio calendula
- Golden-crowned kinglet, Regulus satrapa (O)

== Waxwings ==
Order: Passeriformes Family: Bombycillidae

The waxwings are a group of birds with soft silky plumage and unique red tips to some of the wing feathers. In the Bohemian and cedar waxwings, these tips look like sealing wax and give the group its name. These are arboreal birds of northern forests. They live on insects in summer and berries in winter.

- Bohemian waxwing, Bombycilla garrulus

== Nuthatches ==
Order: Passeriformes Family: Sittidae

Nuthatches are small woodland birds. They have the unusual ability to climb down trees head first, unlike other birds which can only go upwards. Nuthatches have big heads, short tails, and powerful bills and feet.

- Red-breasted nuthatch, Sitta canadensis (R)

== Treecreepers ==
Order: Passeriformes Family: Certhiidae

Treecreepers are small woodland birds, brown above and white below. They have thin pointed down-curved bills, which they use to extricate insects from bark. They have stiff tail feathers, like woodpeckers, which they use to support themselves on vertical trees.

- Brown creeper, Certhia americana (O)

== Starlings ==
Order: Passeriformes Family: Sturnidae

Starlings are small to medium-sized passerine birds. They are medium-sized passerines with strong feet. Their flight is strong and direct and they are very gregarious. Their preferred habitat is fairly open country, and they eat insects and fruit. Plumage is typically dark with a metallic sheen.

- European starling, Sturnus vulgaris (Introduced to North America) (X)

== Dippers ==
Order: Passeriformes Family: Cinclidae

Dippers are small, stout, birds that feed in cold, fast moving streams.

- American dipper, Cinclus mexicanus

== Thrushes and allies ==
Order: Passeriformes Family: Turdidae

The thrushes are a group of passerine birds that occur mainly but not exclusively in the Old World. They are plump, soft plumaged, small to medium-sized insectivores or sometimes omnivores, often feeding on the ground. Many have attractive songs.

- Mountain bluebird, Sialia currucoides (H)
- Townsend's solitaire, Myadestes townsendi
- Gray-cheeked thrush, Catharus minimus
- Swainson's thrush, Catharus ustulatus
- Hermit thrush, Catharus guttatus
- American robin, Turdus migratorius
- Varied thrush, Ixoreus naevius

== Old World flycatchers ==
Order: Passeriformes Family: Muscicapidae

This a large family of small passerine birds restricted to the Old World. Most of the species below only occur in North America as vagrants. The appearance of these birds is highly varied, but they mostly have weak songs and harsh calls.

- Northern wheatear, Oenanthe oenanthe

== Wagtails and pipits ==
Order: Passeriformes Family: Motacillidae

Motacillidae is a family of small passerine birds with medium to long tails. They include the wagtails, longclaws, and pipits. They are slender ground-feeding insectivores of open country.

- Eastern yellow wagtail, Motacilla tschutschensis (H)
- White wagtail, Motacilla alba (H)
- American pipit, Anthus rubescens

== Finches, euphonias, and allies ==
Order: Passeriformes Family: Fringillidae

Finches are seed-eating passerine birds, that are small to moderately large and have a strong beak, usually conical and in some species very large. All have twelve tail feathers and nine primaries. These birds have a bouncing flight with alternating bouts of flapping and gliding on closed wings, and most sing well.

- Pine grosbeak, Pinicola enucleator
- Gray-crowned rosy-finch, Leucosticte tephrocotis
- Purple finch, Haemorhous purpureus (H)
- Redpoll, Acanthis flammea
- White-winged crossbill, Loxia leucoptera
- Pine siskin, Spinus pinus

== Longspurs and snow buntings ==
Order: Passeriformes Family: Calcariidae

The Calcariidae are a group of passerine birds that had been traditionally grouped with the New World sparrows, but differ in a number of respects and are usually found in open grassy areas.

- Lapland longspur, Calcarius lapponicus
- Smith's longspur, Calcarius pictus (O)
- Snow bunting, Plectrophenax nivalis

== New World sparrows ==
Order: Passeriformes Family: Passerellidae

Until 2017, these species were considered part of the family Emberizidae. Most of the species are known as sparrows, but these birds are not closely related to the Old World sparrows which are in the family Passeridae. Many of these have distinctive head patterns.

- Fox sparrow, Passerella iliaca
- American tree sparrow, Spizelloides arborea
- Dark-eyed junco, Junco hyemalis
- White-crowned sparrow, Zonotrichia leucophrys
- Golden-crowned sparrow, Zonotrichia atricapilla
- Savannah sparrow, Passerculus sandwichensis
- Lincoln's sparrow, Melospiza lincolnii

== Troupials and allies ==
Order: Passeriformes Family: Icteridae

The icterids are a group of small to medium-sized, often colorful passerine birds restricted to the New World and include the grackles, New World blackbirds, and New World orioles. Most species have black as a predominant plumage color, often enlivened by yellow, orange, or red.

- Red-winged blackbird, Agelaius phoeniceus (O)
- Rusty blackbird, Euphagus carolinus
- Brown-headed cowbird, Molothrus ater (X)

== New World warblers ==
Order: Passeriformes Family: Parulidae

The wood-warblers are a group of small often colorful passerine birds restricted to the New World. Most are arboreal, but some like the ovenbird and the two waterthrushes are more terrestrial. Most members of this family are insectivores.

- Northern waterthrush, Parkesia noveboracensis
- Tennessee warbler, Leiothlypis peregrina (H)
- Orange-crowned warbler, Leiothlypis celata
- American redstart, Setophaga ruticilla (O)
- Yellow warbler, Setophaga petechia
- Blackpoll warbler, Setophaga striata
- Yellow-rumped warbler, Setophaga coronata
- Townsend's warbler, Setophaga townsendi (X)
- Wilson's warbler, Cardellina pusilla

== Cardinals and allies ==
Order: Passeriformes Family: Cardinalidae

The cardinals are a family of robust seed-eating birds with strong bills. They are typically associated with open woodland. The sexes usually have distinct plumages.

- Western tanager, Piranga ludoviciana (X)

== See also ==
- List of birds of Alaska
- List of birds
- Lists of birds by region
- List of North American birds
