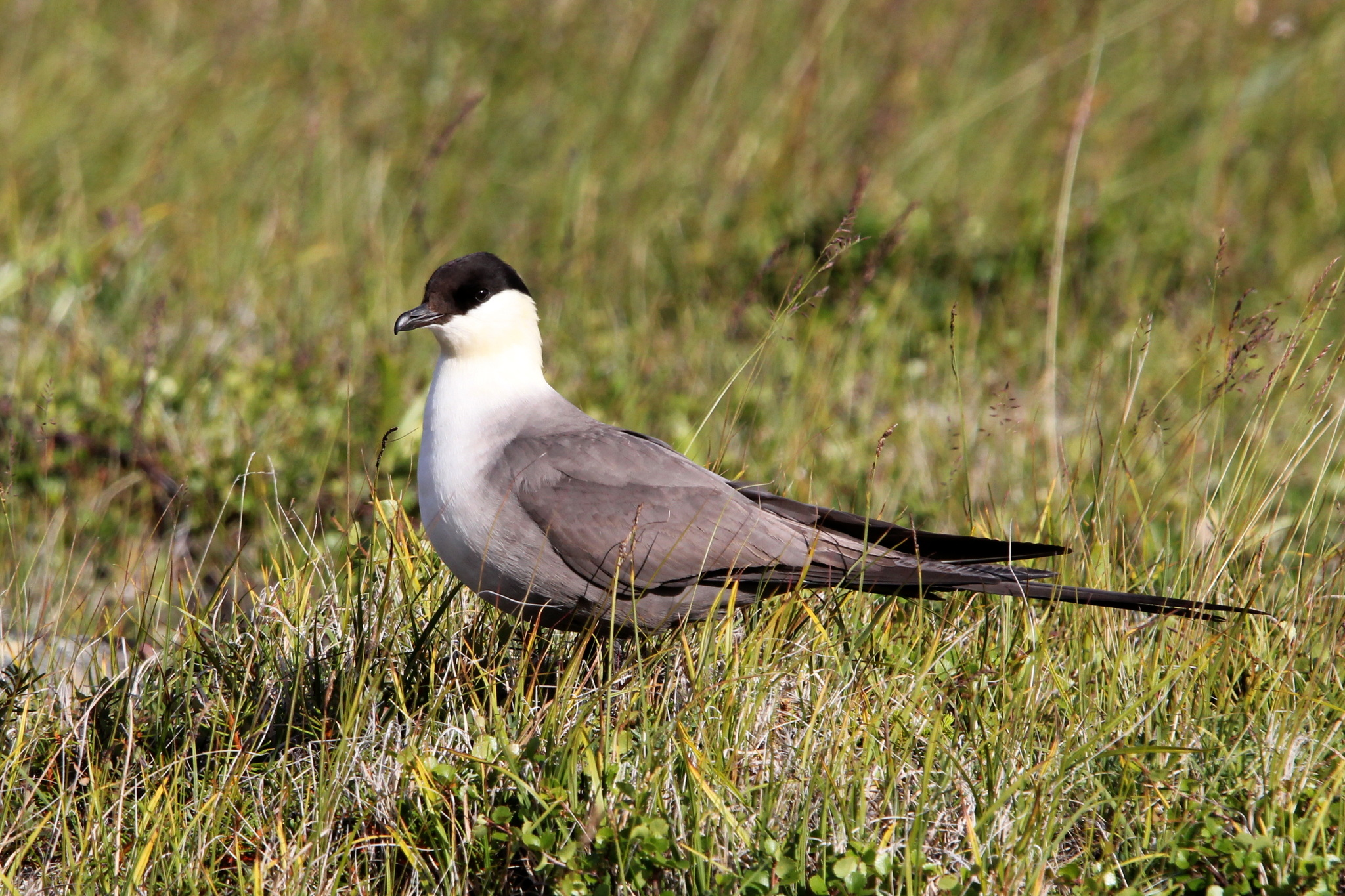

Conservation status
- Least Concern (IUCN 3.1)

Scientific classification
- Kingdom: Animalia
- Phylum: Chordata
- Class: Aves
- Order: Charadriiformes
- Family: Stercorariidae
- Genus: Stercorarius
- Species: S. longicaudus

Binomial name
- Stercorarius longicaudus Vieillot, 1819

= Long-tailed jaeger =

Species of bird

The long-tailed jaeger or long-tailed skua (Stercorarius longicaudus) is a seabird in the skua family Stercorariidae.

== Etymology ==
The word "jaeger" is derived from the German word Jäger, meaning "hunter". The English word "skua" comes from the Faroese name skúgvur [ˈskɪkvʊər] for the great skua, with the island of Skúvoy known for its colony of that bird. The general Faroese term for skuas is kjógvi [ˈtʃɛkvə]. The genus name Stercorarius is Latin and means "of dung"; the food disgorged by other birds when pursued by skuas was once thought to be excrement. The specific longicaudus is from Latin longus, "long", and cauda, "tail".

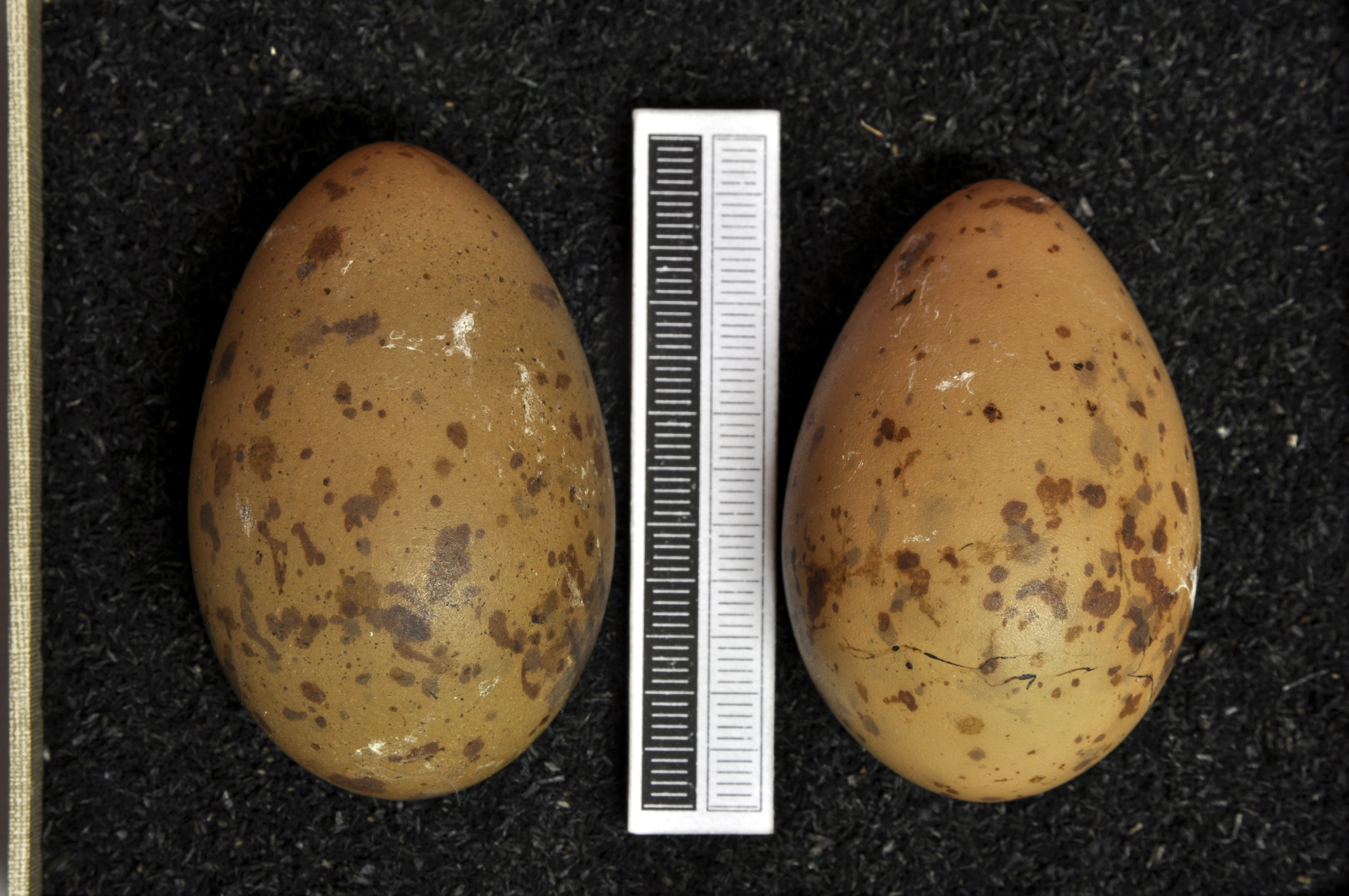
Eggs, Collection Museum Wiesbaden

== Description ==
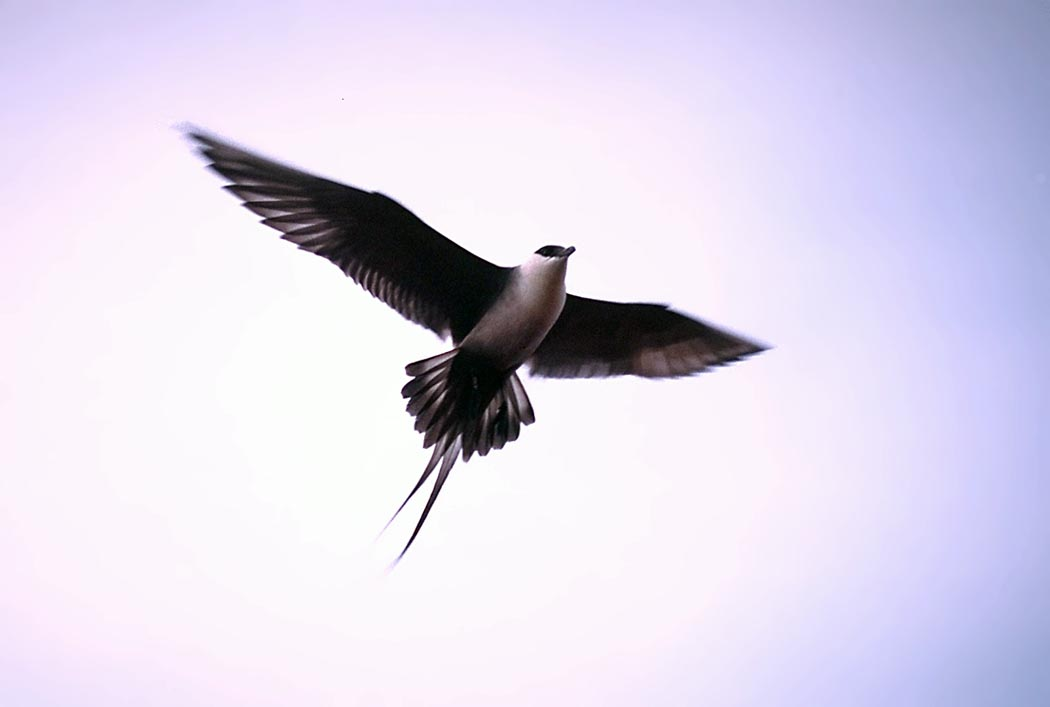
Long-tailed jaeger in flight

This species is unmistakable as an adult, with grey back, dark primary wing feathers without a white "flash", black cap and very long tail. Adults often hover over their breeding territories. Juveniles are much more problematic, and are difficult to separate from parasitic jaeger over the sea. They are slimmer, longer-winged and more tern-like than that species, but show the same wide range of plumage variation. However, they are usually colder toned than Arctic, with greyer shades, rather than brown.

This is the smallest of the skua family at 38–58 cm (15–23 in), depending on season and age. However up to 29 cm (11 in) of its length can be made up by the tail which may include the 15 cm (5.9 in) tail streamers of the summer adult. The wingspan of this species ranges from 102 to 117 cm (40 to 46 in) and the body mass is 230–444 g (8.1–15.7 oz).

=== Feeding ===
When at sea, the long-tailed jaeger will catch fish and other small prey at the surface of the water. During the breeding season (summer in arctic regions, often in mountainous areas) it feeds mainly on lemmings near nesting sites. It will sometimes feed on insects and birds. Like other jaegers and skuas, it is also a kleptoparasite, chasing other seabirds to make them give up their food. This appears to be an important food source during the winter months, spent south of the equator. The bird species most commonly "robbed" this way by the long-tailed jaeger are Arctic terns (Sterna paradisaea) and Sabine's gulls (Xema sabini).

== Subspecies ==
Two subspecies are described:

- S. l. longicaudus – Vieillot, 1819: nominate, found in northern Scandinavia and Russia.
- S. l. pallescens – Løppenthin, 1932: found in eastern Siberia, Arctic North America, and Greenland.

== Breeding ==
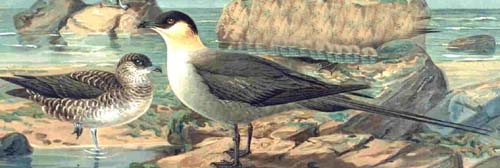
Long-tailed jaeger illustration by Johann Friedrich Naumann

This species breeds in the high Arctic of Eurasia and North America, with major populations in Russia, Alaska and Canada and smaller populations around the rest of the Arctic. It is a migrant, wintering in the south Atlantic and Pacific. Passage juvenile birds sometimes hunt small prey in ploughed fields or golf-courses, and are typically quite fearless of humans.

They nest on dry tundra or higher fells laying two spotted olive-brown eggs. On the breeding grounds they can be heard making yelping and rattling sounds. Outside of the breeding season they spend most of their time over open ocean and have a harsh kreeah cry. This bird feeds on fish (mainly caught from other seabirds), smaller birds, food scraps, small mammals, fruit and carrion.
