= Taxonomic sequence =

Ordering of biological taxonomies

Taxonomic sequence (also known as systematic, phyletic or taxonomic order) is a sequence followed in listing of taxa which aids ease of use and roughly reflects the evolutionary relationships among the taxa. Taxonomic sequences can exist for taxa within any rank, that is, a list of families, genera, species can each have a sequence.

Early biologists used the concept of "age" or "primitiveness" of the groups in question to derive an order of arrangement, with "older" or more "primitive" groups being listed first and more recent or "advanced" ones last. A modern understanding of evolutionary biology has brought about a more robust framework for the taxonomic ordering of lists. A list may be seen as a rough one-dimensional representation of a phylogenetic tree. Taxonomic sequences are essentially heuristic devices that help in arrangements of linear systems such as books and information retrieval systems. Since phylogenetic relationships are complex and non-linear, there is no unique way to define the sequence, although they generally have the more basal listed first with species that cluster in a tight group included next to each other.

The organization of field guides and taxonomic monographs may either follow or prescribe the taxonomic sequence; changes in these sequences are often introduced by new publications.

== Bibliography ==
- Haston, Elspeth; Richardson, James E.; Stevens, Peter F.; Chase, Mark W. & Harris, D.J. (2009), "The Linear Angiosperm Phylogeny Group (LAPG) III: a linear sequence of the families in APG III", Botanical Journal of the Linnean Society, 161 (2): 128–31, doi:10.1111/j.1095-8339.2009.01000.x
- Hawthorne, W.D. & Hughes, C.E. (2008), "Optimising linear taxon sequences derived from phylogenetic trees – a reply to Haston et al.", Taxon, 57 (3): 698–704, Bibcode:2008Taxon..57..698H, doi:10.1002/tax.573002
