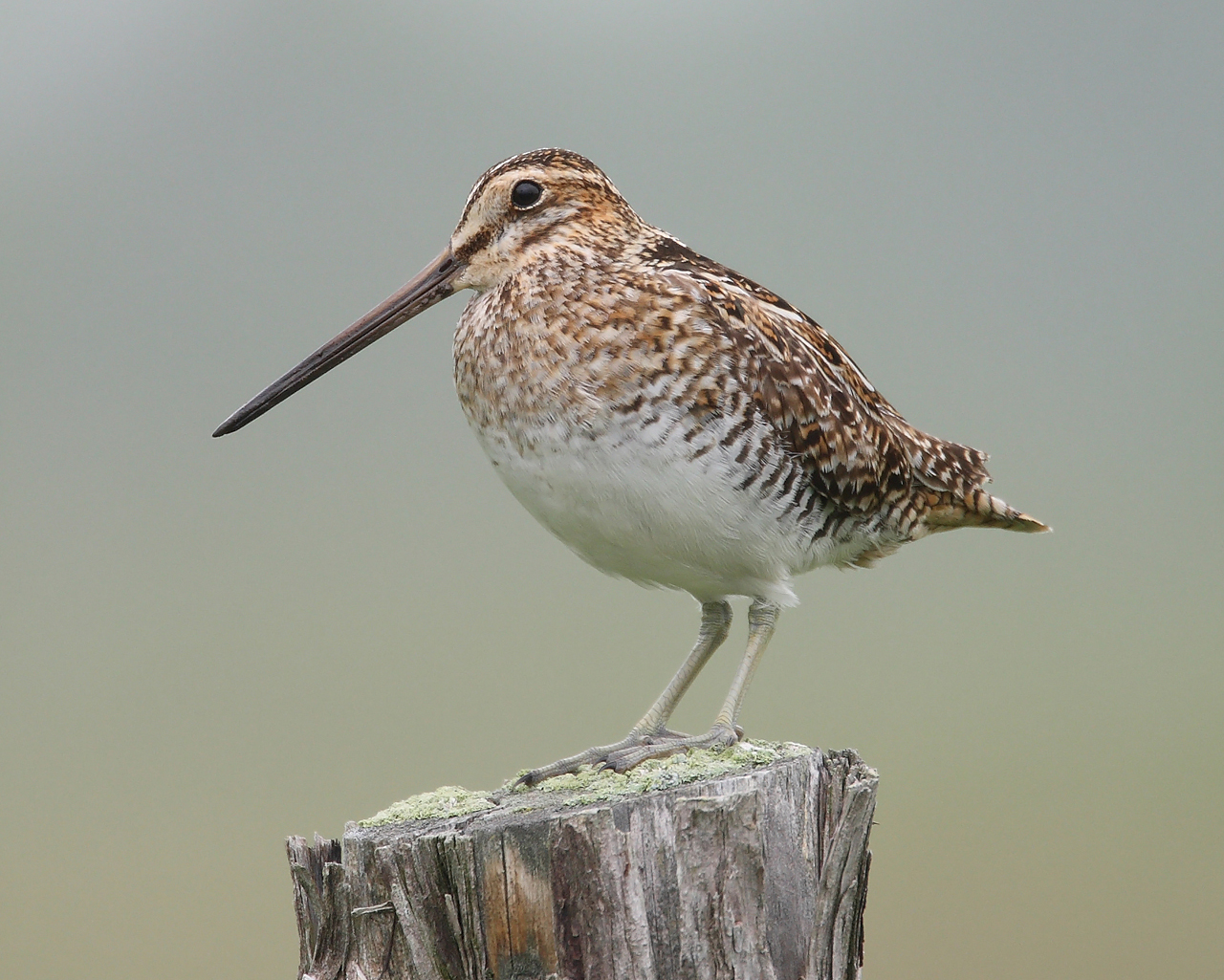

Conservation status
- Least Concern (IUCN 3.1)

Scientific classification
- Kingdom: Animalia
- Phylum: Chordata
- Class: Aves
- Order: Charadriiformes
- Family: Scolopacidae
- Genus: Gallinago
- Species: G. delicata

Binomial name
- Gallinago delicata (Ord, 1825)

Synonyms
- Gallinago gallinago delicata Ord, 1825

= Wilson's snipe =

Species of bird

Wilson's snipe (Gallinago delicata) is a small, stocky shorebird. The generic name Gallinago is Neo-Latin for a woodcock or snipe from Latin gallina, "hen" and the suffix -ago, "resembling". The specific name delicata is Latin for "dainty".

This species was considered to be a subspecies of the common snipe (G. gallinago) until 2003 when it was given its own species status, though not all authorities recognized this immediately. Wilson's snipe differs from the latter species in having a narrower white trailing edge to the wings, and eight pairs of tail feathers instead of the typical seven of the common snipe. Its common name commemorates the American ornithologist Alexander Wilson.

== Description ==
Adults are 23–28 cm (9.1–11.0 in) in length with a 39–45 cm (15–18 in) wingspan. Weight ranges from 2.8–5.2 oz (79–147 g). They have short greenish-grey legs and a very long straight dark bill. The body is mottled brown on top and pale underneath. They have a dark stripe through the eye, with light stripes above and below it. The wings are pointed.

== Breeding and habits ==
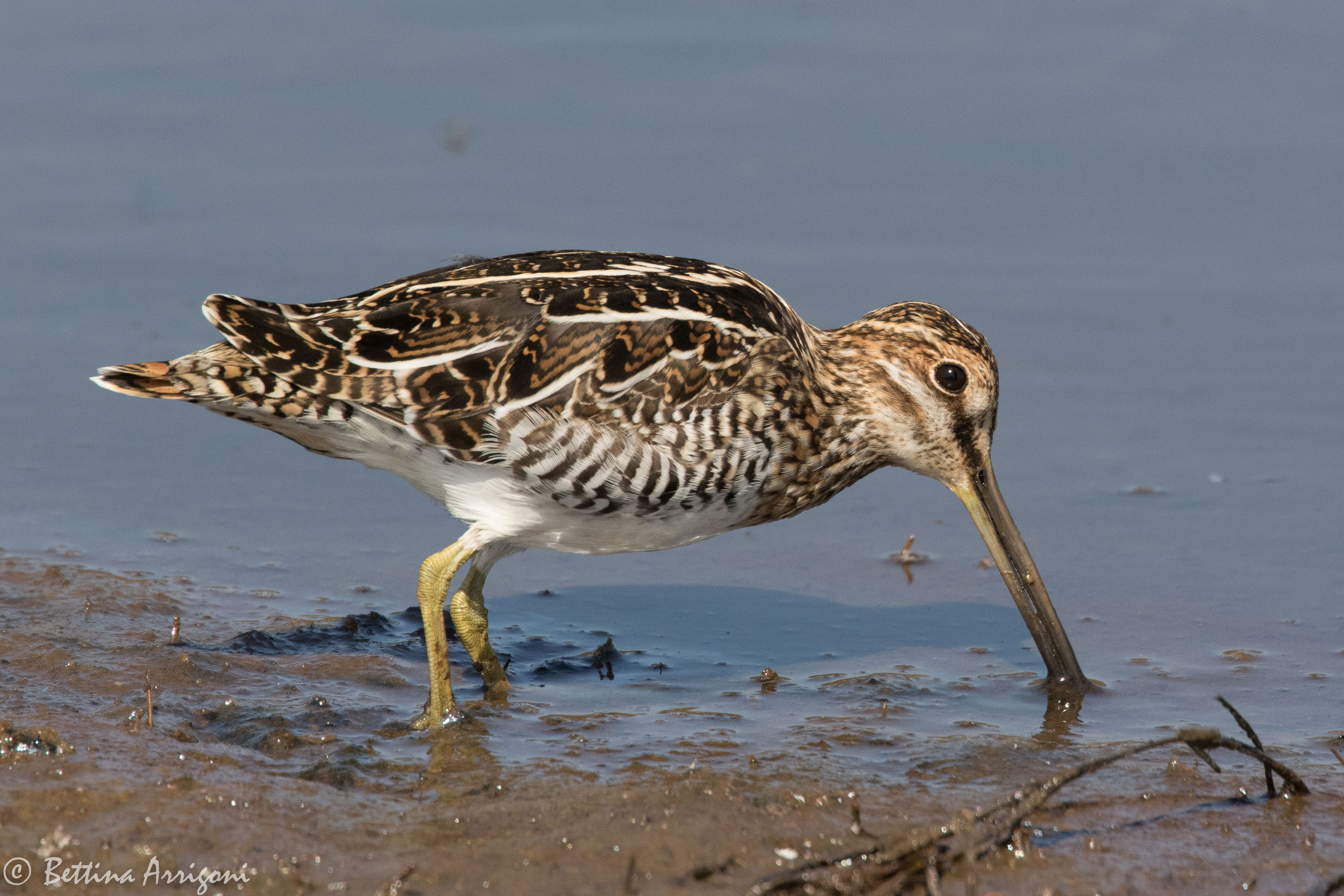
Wilson's snipe feeding

They breed in marshes, bogs, tundra and wet meadows in Canada and the northern United States and on the Chukchi Peninsula, Russia. They are year-round residents on the U.S. Pacific coast. The eastern population migrates to the southern United States, the Caribbean, and to northern South America. It may be that climate change causes these birds to move to their breeding range earlier and leave later than 100 years ago. In Ohio for example, late April was recorded as an average migration date in 1906, but now most of the local population is present on the breeding grounds by then already.

They forage in soft mud, probing or picking up food by sight and eating insects, earthworms, and plant material. Well-camouflaged, they are usually shy and conceal themselves close to ground vegetation, flushing only when approached closely. They fly off in a series of aerial zig-zags to confuse predators.

The male performs "winnowing" display during courtship, flying high in circles and then taking shallow dives to produce a distinctive sound. They have been observed "winnowing" throughout the day and long into the night. The "winnowing" sound is similar to the call of a boreal owl. They nest in a well-hidden location on the ground.

== Population ==
Wilson's snipe was reduced near the end of the 19th century by hunting and habitat destruction. However, this bird remains fairly common and not considered threatened by the IUCN, although local populations are sensitive to large-scale draining of wetland.
