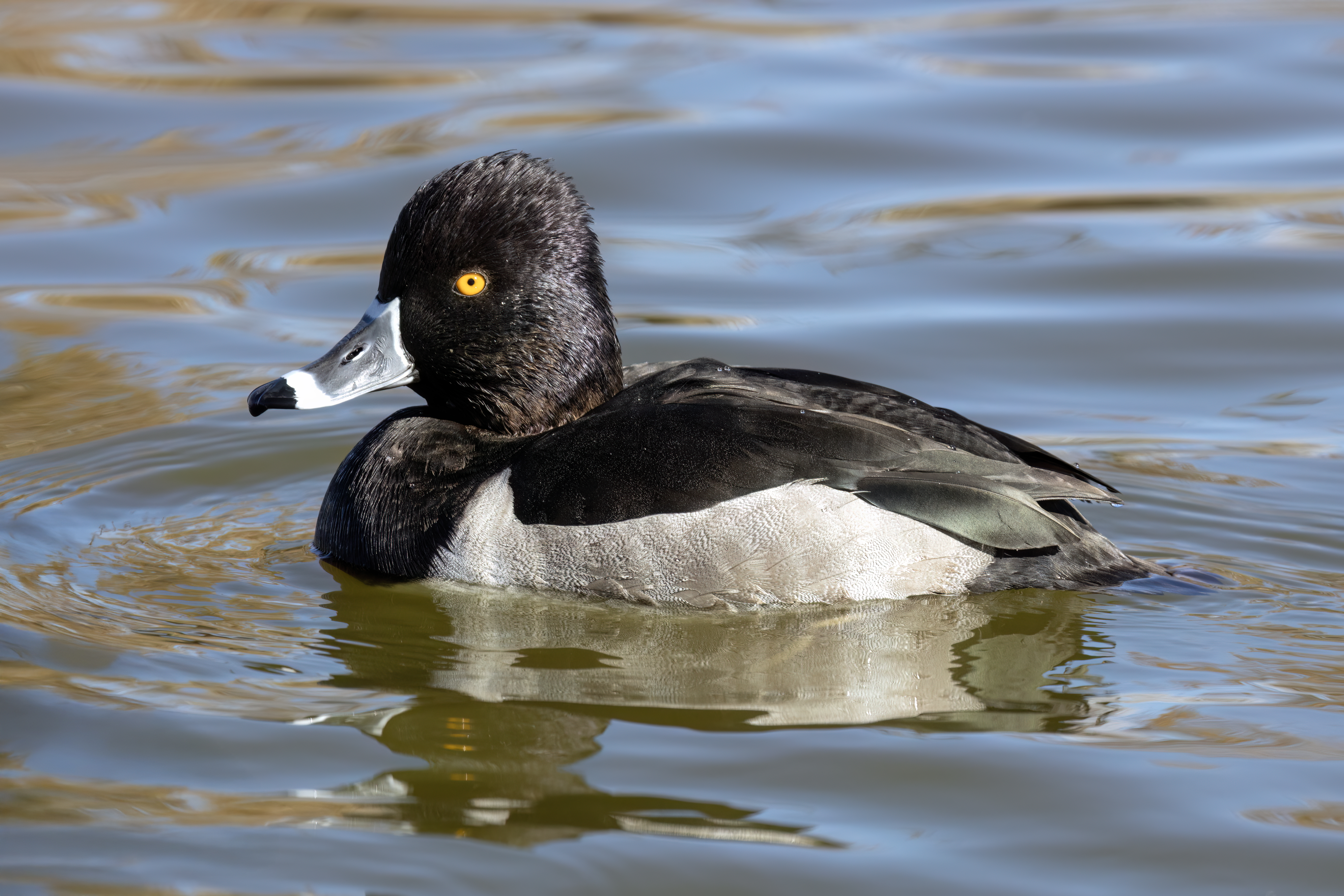
- Drake (male)
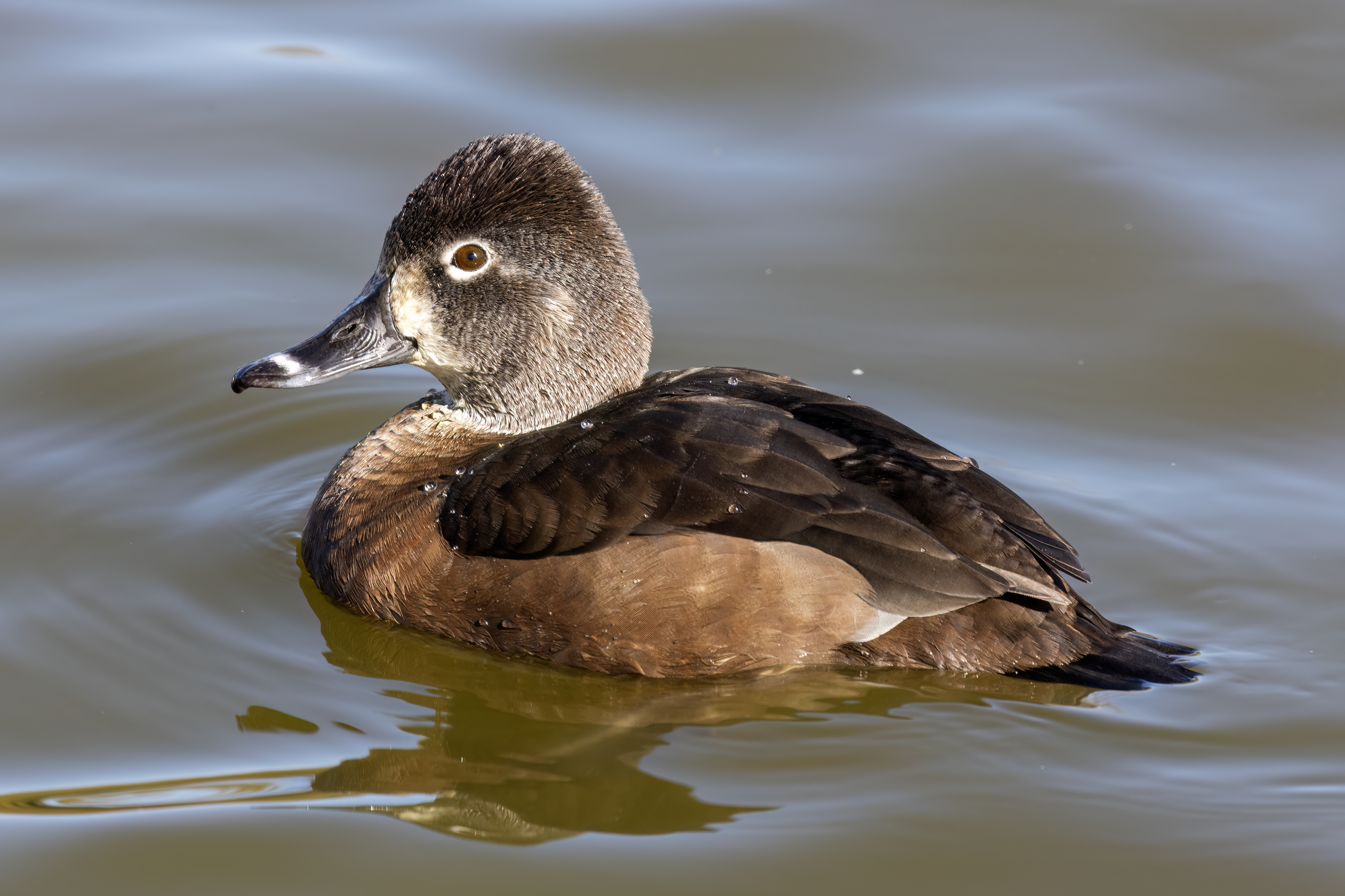
- Hen (female)

Conservation status
- Least Concern (IUCN 3.1)

Scientific classification
- Kingdom: Animalia
- Phylum: Chordata
- Class: Aves
- Order: Anseriformes
- Family: Anatidae
- Genus: Aythya
- Species: A. collaris

Binomial name
- Aythya collaris (Donovan, 1809)
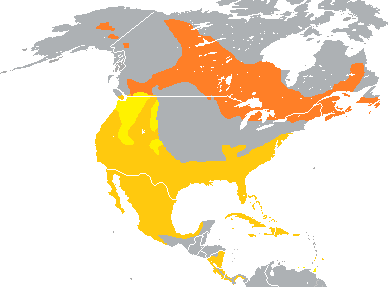
- Range of A. collaris Breeding range Year-round range Wintering range

Synonyms
- Anas collaris Donovan, 1809; Nyroca collaris (Donovan, 1809)

= Ring-necked duck =

Species of bird

The ring-necked duck (Aythya collaris) is a diving duck from North America commonly found in freshwater ponds and lakes. The scientific name is derived from Greek aithuia, an unidentified seabird mentioned by authors including Hesychius and Aristotle, and Latin collaris, "of the neck" from collum, "neck".

== Description ==
Ring-necked ducks are small to medium-sized diving ducks with the following length, weight, and wingspan measurements:

- Length: 15.3–18.1 in (39–46 cm)
- Weight: 17.3–32.1 oz (490–910 g)
- Wingspan: 24.4–24.8 in (62–63 cm)

The adult male is similar in color pattern to the Eurasian tufted duck, its relative. Males are a little bit bigger than the female. It has two white rings surrounding its gray bill, a shiny black angular head, black back, white line on the wings, a white breast and yellow eyes. The adult female has a grayish brown angular head and body with a dark brown back, a dark bill with a more subtle light band than the male, grayish-blue feet and brown eyes with white rings surrounding them. Females also make a noise like trrr. The cinnamon neck ring is usually difficult to observe, which is why the bird is sometimes referred to as a "ringbill".

== Breeding and migration ==
Their breeding habitat is wooded lakes or ponds in the northern United States and Canada. The main breeding area is Northwest boreal forest territories. Their breeding habits also take place in the eastern boreal region of Canada but nowhere near the same amount in the northwestern region. In the winter months they are usually found in southern North America in lakes, ponds, rivers or bays. Ring-necked duck pairs start during spring migration. Unpaired ducks showing up on breeding grounds will most likely end up being non-breeders. The pairs stay together only for reproduction, after that, they separate. The nest is bowl-shaped, built on water in dense emergent vegetation with sedges and woody plants. The female lays one egg per day until 8 to 10 eggs are laid. Eggs measure 1.9–2.4 cm (0.8–0.9 in) in length and 1.4–1.7 cm (0.6–0.7 in) in width. They are incubated 25–29 days and the female may remain with the young until they are able to fly.

== Diet ==
These birds are omnivores and feed mainly by diving or dabbling at the surface. Ducklings are dependent on animal matter such as insects, earthworms, leeches, midges and snails. As they mature they tend change their diet to submerged plants such as pondweed and coontail, and emergents such as annual wild rice and snails.

== Vagrancy ==
This strong migrant is a rare but regular vagrant to western Europe. In Britain, occasional small flocks occur, including five at Loch Leven, Scotland in September 2003 and four at Standlake in Oxfordshire in April 2015. In Ireland one or two individuals can be seen at any time of year. Vagrant individuals also occur each year in Central America as far south as Costa Rica between October/November and May/June. They have also been reported in small numbers in Suriname and French Guiana, in northern South America.
