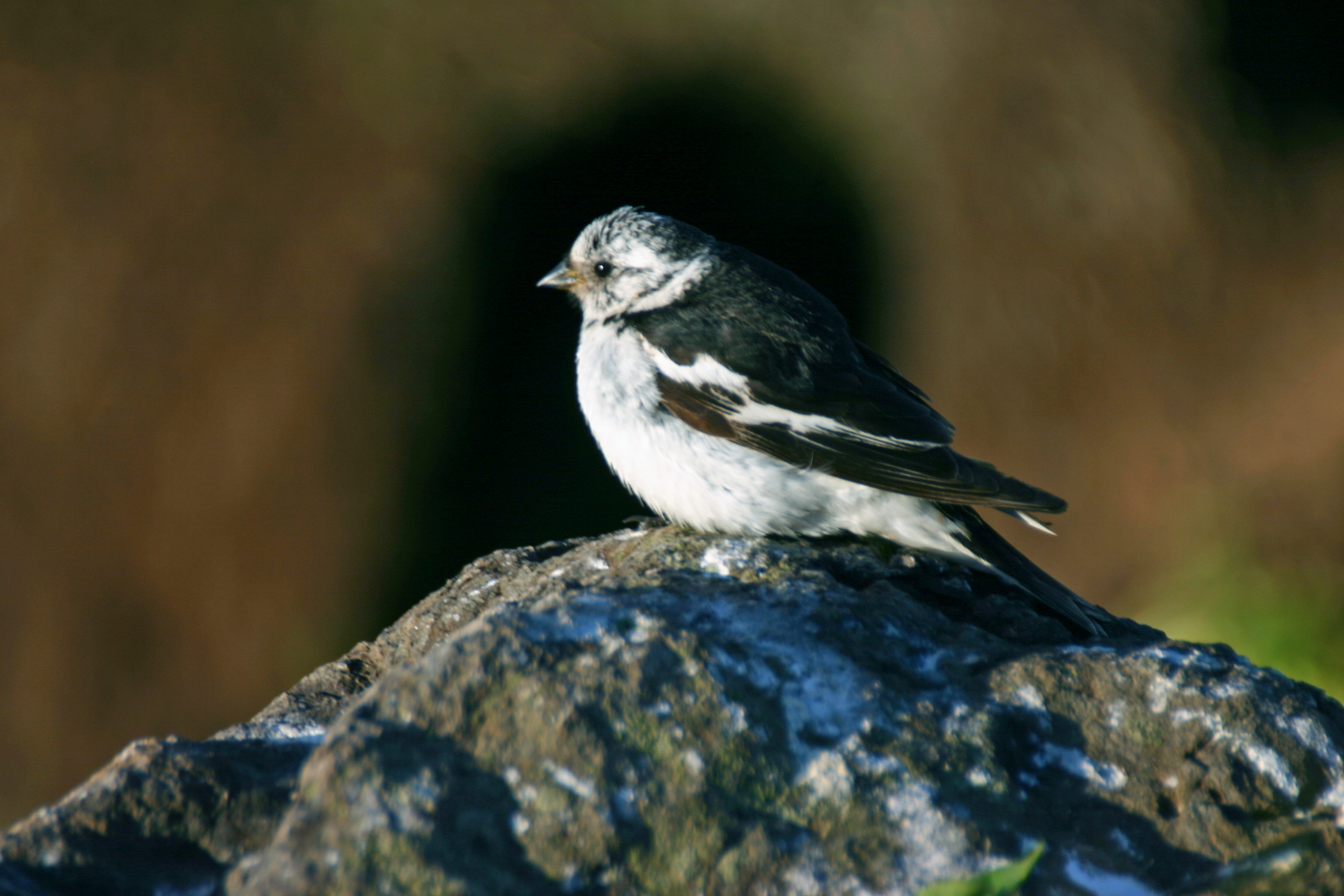
- Snow bunting (Plectrophenax nivalis)

Scientific classification
- Kingdom: Animalia
- Phylum: Chordata
- Class: Aves
- Order: Passeriformes
- Family: Calcariidae
- Genus: Plectrophenax; Stejneger, 1882

Type species
- Emberiza nivalis Linnaeus, 1758

Species
- P. nivalis P. hyperboreus

= Plectrophenax =

Genus of birds

Plectrophenax is a small genus of passerine birds of the longspur family Calcariidae.

== Taxonomy ==
The genus Plectrophenax was introduced in 1882 by the Norwegian born zoologist Leonhard Stejneger with the snow bunting as the type species. The name combines the Ancient Greek πλῆκτρον (plêktron), meaning "cock’s spur", and φένᾱξ (phénāx), meaning "imposter".

=== Species ===
The genus contains two species, which may be conspecific.

Genus Plectrophenax – Stejneger, 1882 – 2 species
Common name	Scientific name and subspecies	Range	Size and ecology	IUCN status and estimated population
Snow bunting	Plectrophenax nivalis (Linnaeus, 1758) Four subspecies: P. n. nivalis (Linnaeus, 1758): Arctic Europe, Arctic North America; P. n. insulae (Salomonsen, 1931): Iceland, Faroe Islands, Scotland; P. n. vlasowae (Portenko, 1937): Arctic Asia; P. n. townsendi (Ridgway, 1887): Aleutian Islands, Kamchatka, coastal far eastern Siberia	Circumpolar Arctic breeding range (high Arctic tundra of North America, Ellesmere Island, Iceland, Scotland, Norway, Russia, North Greenland, Siberia, Novaya Zemlya and Franz Josef Land), with small isolated populations on a few high mountain tops south of the Arctic, including the Cairngorms in Scotland, the Saint Elias Mountains on the southern Alaska–Yukon border and the Cape Breton Highlands; winters in the northern temperate zone, including southern Canada, the northern United States, northern Europe and east to central Asia Breeding Migration Year-round Nonbreeding	Size: 15 cm (5.9 in); wingspan 32–38 cm (13–15 in); weight 30–40 g (1.1–1.4 oz) Habitat: Rocky habitats in the Arctic tundra, nesting in cavities, rock cracks and fissures; wet sedge meadows and areas rich in dryas and lichens; in winter, open habitats such as farms, barren fields and lakeshores Diet: Forages on the ground; seeds from fall to spring (weeds such as knotweed, ragweed, amaranth, goosefoot, aster and goldenrod, and grass seeds), foraging in snow for seeds on lower stems; in summer also seeds of crowberry, bilberry, bistort, dock, poppy and purple saxifrage, and invertebrates (butterflies, true bugs, flies, wasps, spiders); nestlings fed exclusively invertebrates	LC
McKay's bunting	Plectrophenax hyperboreus Ridgway, 1884	Breeds on two islands in the Bering Sea, St. Matthew and Hall Islands; winters on the western coast of Alaska	Size: 18 cm (7.1 in); weight 38–62 g (1.3–2.2 oz) Habitat: Nests on shingle beaches in hollow drift logs and rock crevices; winters on coastal marshes, shingle beaches and agricultural fields Diet: Presumed similar to snow bunting: seeds from weeds and grasses in winter; seeds, buds and insects in summer	LC 19,481 individuals

They are high Arctic breeding seed-eating birds with stubby, conical bills, and much white in the plumage, especially in adult males. They nest in rock crevices. As would be expected, both species are highly migratory, wintering in more temperate areas.

The plumages are similar, but McKay's has more white and less black in the plumage, especially in the wings and tail. Adult breeding males of both species are mainly white with contrasting black on at least the wings, but are duller in winter. Females have white and brown plumage. The calls of both species are identical and include a low warbled hudidi feet feet feew hudidi feet feet feew hudidi.
