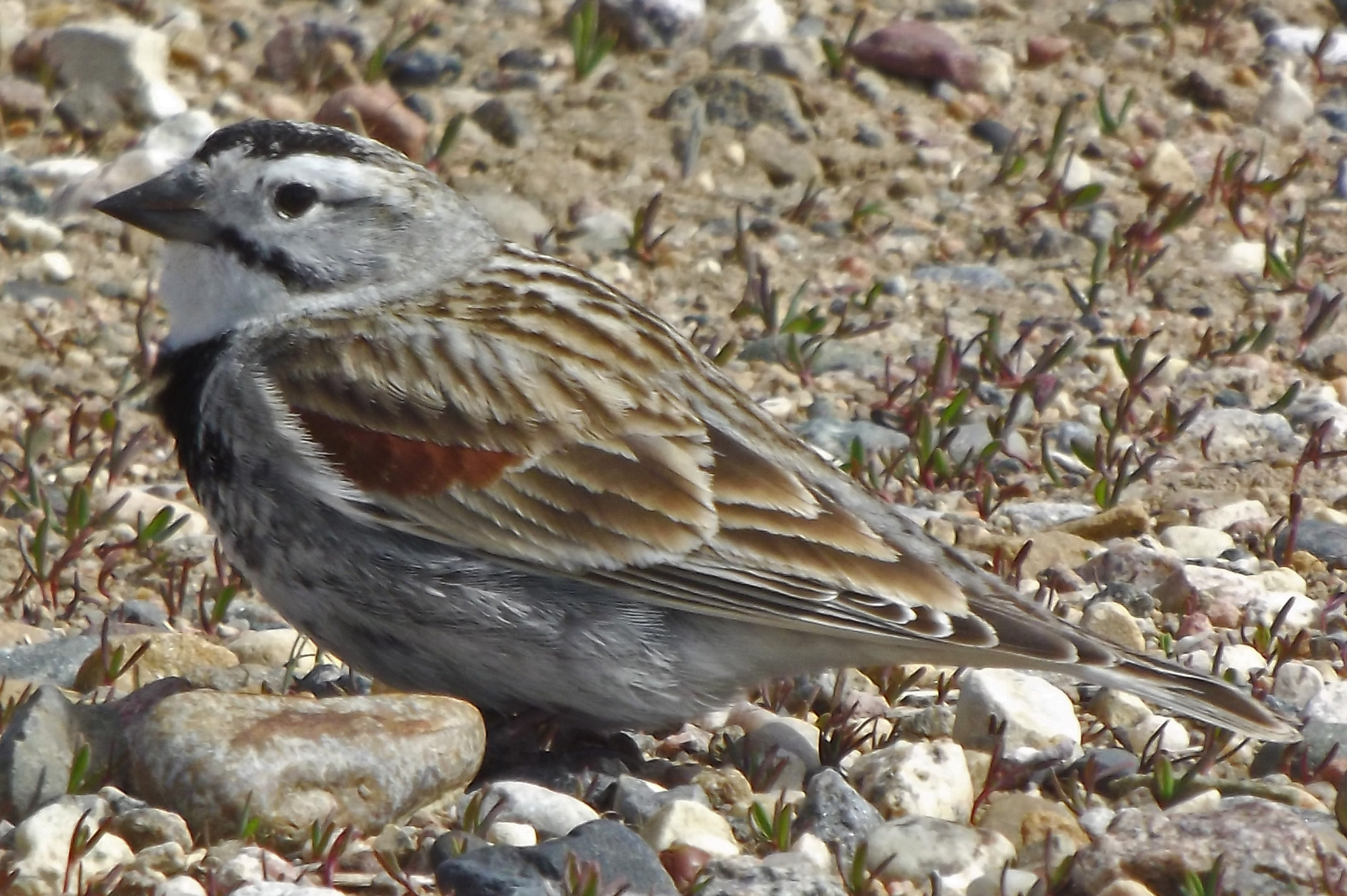

Conservation status
- Least Concern (IUCN 3.1)

Scientific classification
- Kingdom: Animalia
- Phylum: Chordata
- Class: Aves
- Order: Passeriformes
- Family: Calcariidae
- Genus: Rhynchophanes; Baird, 1858
- Species: R. mccownii

Binomial name
- Rhynchophanes mccownii (Lawrence, 1851)
- Breeding Migration Nonbreeding

= Thick-billed longspur =

Species of bird

The thick-billed longspur, also known as McCown's longspur (Rhynchophanes mccownii), is a small ground-feeding bird in the family Calcariidae, which also contains the other longspurs and snow buntings. It is found in North America and is the only species in the genus Rhynchophanes.

== Taxonomy ==
The thick-billed longspur was described in 1851 by the American amateur ornithologist George Newbold Lawrence under the English name rufous-winged lark bunting. He placed it in the genus Plectrophanes and coined the binomial name Plectrophanes mccownii. It was moved into its own genus Rhynchophanes in 1858 by Spencer Baird on account of its bill size and short spur, but was moved to Calcarius after a hybrid with the chestnut-collared longspur was discovered. It was once again placed in its own genus after a 2003 genetic study found it was more closely related to the snow buntings than the other longspurs.

"McCown's longspur" is no longer used by the American Ornithological Society, instead being changed to "thick-billed longspur", a literal translation of its genus name, Rhynchophanes. The IOC Bird List has followed suit with the name change.

The name "McCown" refers to Captain John P. McCown, a United States Army officer who collected the specimen in 1851 that led to the species first being scientifically described. McCown later fought for the Confederate States Army during the American Civil War, which led to controversy starting in 2018, with parallels drawn to the removal of Confederate memorials. The pressure to change the name increased following the George Floyd protests and Black Birder's Week (itself a response to the Central Park birdwatching incident).

== Description ==
The thick-billed longspur is about 15 cm (5.9 in) long, has a wingspan of 28 cm (11 in) and weighs around 25 g (0.88 oz). It has a large cone-shaped bill, a streaked back, a rust-coloured shoulder and a white tail with a dark tip. In breeding plumage, the male has a white throat and underparts, a grey face and nape and a black crown. Breeding females are largely gray, with a pale bill and rusty tinged median coverts and scapulars. Non-breeding males are similar to females but with crowns spotted rather than streaked, and more chestnut on their median coverts and scapulars.

Juveniles are seen briefly in late summer and are more uniformly sandy, with a streaked upper breast and white belly.

== Distribution and habitat ==
Thick-billed longspurs breed in the northwestern Great Plains states and southern Prairie Provinces. They prefer the sparsely vegetated habitat of the semi-arid shortgrass steppes, which provide a mix of perennial shortgrasses and cacti. The breeding range of thick-billed longspurs has drastically reduced; historically, it stretched farther south into Oklahoma, and east into Minnesota and Manitoba.

Their non-breeding range stretches from south Oklahoma into Texas and Northern Mexico. Here, they prefer open habitats with sparse vegetation such as shortgrass prairie, plowed fields, grazed pastures and dried lake beds.

== Behavior ==
The male produces a distinctive tinkling song, often in flight. The calls include a dry rattle.

Nests are constructed in a shallow depression on the ground, and incubate the eggs for about 12 days. Both parents feed the young, and fledglings leave the nest about 10 days after hatching, before they can properly fly. Outside the breeding season, thick-billed longspurs occur in flocks, sometimes with other species like Lapland longspur and horned lark.

The diet consists of seeds and insects.

== Conservation ==
The numbers and range of these birds have declined since the early 1900s, likely due to habitat loss.
