= Gideon B. Smith =

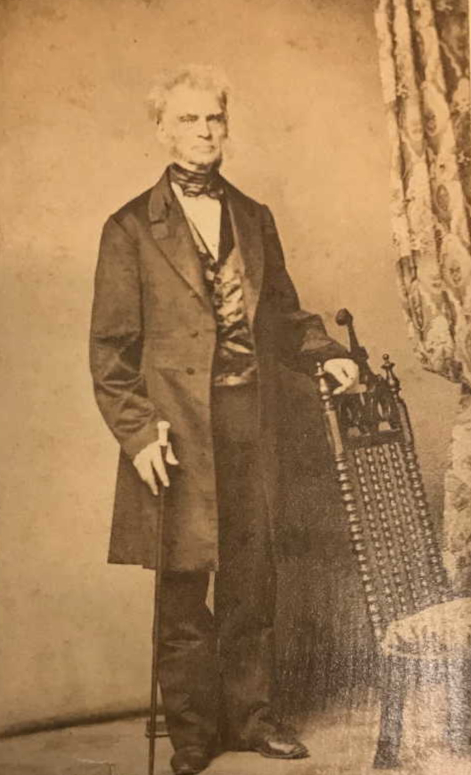

Gideon B. Smith (1793 – March 24, 1867) was an American medical doctor and amateur entomologist who studied the breeding biology of the 13-year and 17-year cicadas by gathering information from correspondents across the US. He was a friend and physician of John James Audubon who named a bird as "Smith's Lark Bunting", now known as Smith's longspur (Calcarius pictus). Smith was also involved in sericulture and patented inventions in the field.

== Life and work ==
Smith was born in Maryland and received an MD from the University of Maryland in 1840 with a thesis Cholera Infantum. While studying he was also involved in assisting John Stuart Skinner, the editor of The American Farmer and in 1830 he became its editor, serving for three years. During this time he took an interest in sericulture and wrote a pamphlet on raising silkworms. From 1839 to 1840 he edited the Journal of the American Silk Association. He invented a silk reel which he patented and sold. As a friend and physician to John James Audubon, he helped sell subscriptions for Audubon's book. Audubon named a species of bird as Smith's Lark-Bunting or Plectrophanes Smithii but this had already been described as Calcarius pictus by Swainson. The English name of Smith's longspur continues to be used. In 1848 he was reported to the Board of Medical Examiners for unprofessional conduct resulting in the end of his medical career.

Smith studied cicadas with physician Nathaniel Potter (1770–1843, he helped found the Maryland college of medicine in 1807) who had first seen the 17-year cicadas in 1783 and was examining them again in 1817. Potter wrote in 1839 that "As our professional avocations would not permit us to devote our whole time to the [study of locusts], it became necessary to call in the aid of a colleague whose knowledge of entomology, and industry could be relied on. These qualifications were found and well exemplified in Mr. Gideon B. Smith. Should our labours reflect any light on so obscure a subject, the credit is equally due to him." After the death of Potter, Smith sent out notices to postmasters and editors of regional periodicals to send report of cicada emergence to him. Smith continued the studies and in 1845 he received reports from Dr David Lewis Phares of cicada emergence in Mississippi after 13 years. Smith would later verify and confirm that there was a 13-year cicada which he called as Cicada tredecim in 1858. He was able to predict the emergence of 17-year cicadas and wrote about it in a local newspaper, The Sun, on February 1, 1851, predicting emergence in Maryland, Pennsylvania, Virginia and Delaware. In 1858 he sent out lookouts for the emergence of 13-year cicadas. He also published his only known scientific note in the Scientific American.

Smith married Elizabeth Bennett in 1826 and they had a daughter. After the death of Elisabeth in 1832, he married Susan Stewart in 1833. He is buried in Mount Olivet Cemetery, Baltimore.
