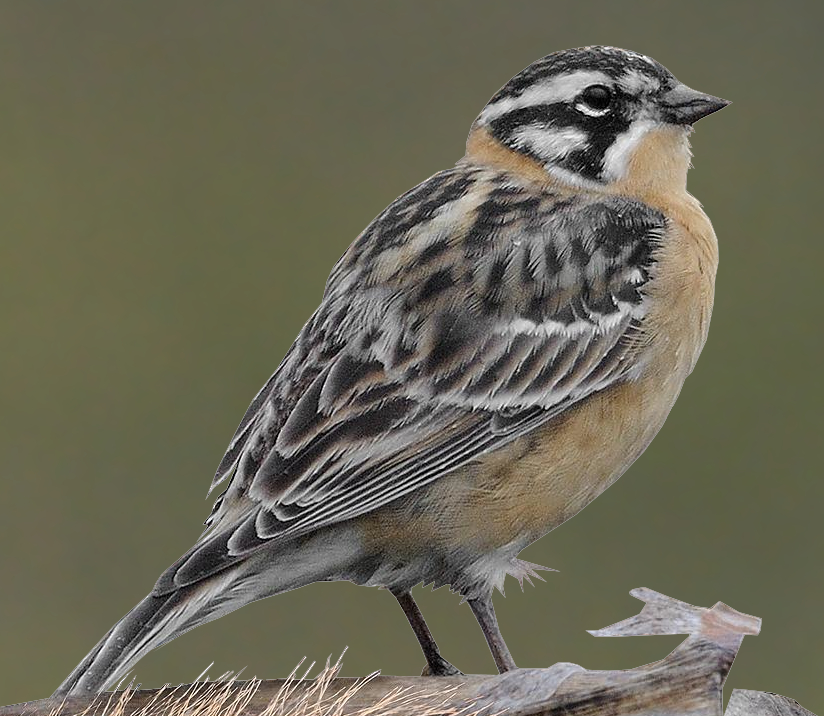
- Male
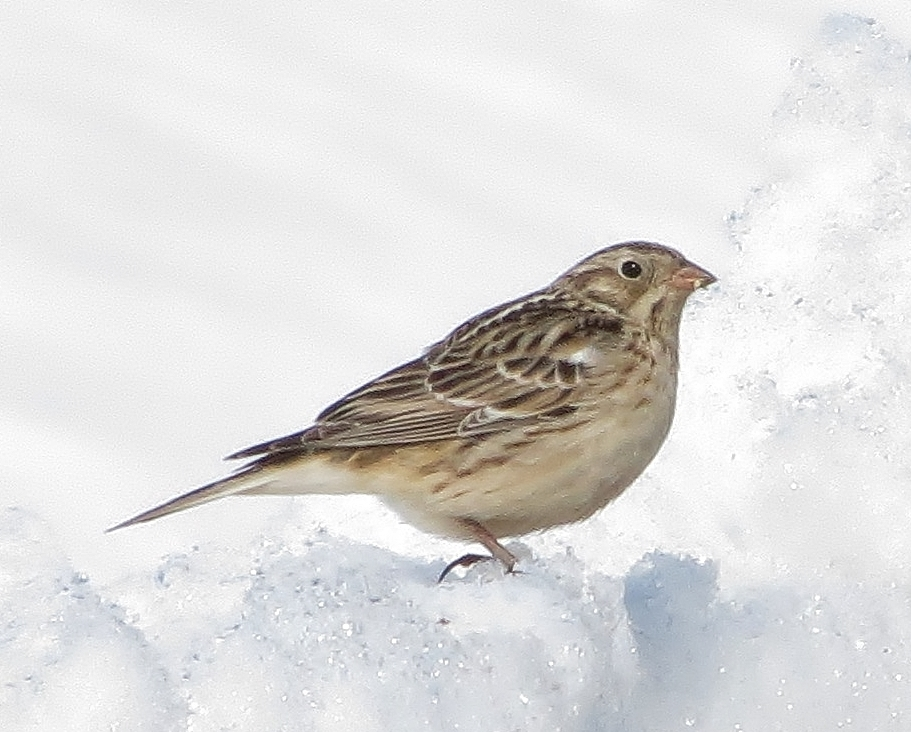
- Female

Conservation status
- Least Concern (IUCN 3.1)

Scientific classification
- Kingdom: Animalia
- Phylum: Chordata
- Class: Aves
- Order: Passeriformes
- Family: Calcariidae
- Genus: Calcarius
- Species: C. pictus

Binomial name
- Calcarius pictus (Swainson, 1832)
- Breeding Migration Nonbreeding

= Smith's longspur =

Species of bird

Smith's longspur (Calcarius pictus) is a bird from the family Calcariidae, which also contains the other species of longspurs. A bird of open habitats, it breeds in northern Canada and Alaska, and winters in the southern United States. Primarily a ground-feeding seed-eater, it supplements its diet with insects in the summer.

== Description ==
These birds have short cone-shaped bills, streaked backs, and dark tails with white outer rectrices. In breeding state plumage (mostly formed by worn basic plumage), the male has a pumpkin-orange throat, nape, and underparts contrasting with an intricate black-and-white face pattern. The white lesser coverts are quite pronounced on a male in spring and early summer. Females and immatures have lightly streaked buffy underparts, dark crowns, brown wings with less obvious white lesser coverts, and a light-colored face. The tail is identical at all ages.

=== Measurements ===
- Length: 15–17 cm (5.9–6.7 in)
- Weight: 20–31 g (0.7–1.1 oz)
- Wingspan: 25 cm (9.8 in)

== Distribution and habitat ==
This bird breeds in open grassy areas near the tree line in northern Canada and Alaska. In winter, they congregate in open fields, including airports, in the south-central United States. Migration is elliptical, with northbound birds staging in Illinois in the spring and southbound birds flying over the Great Plains in the fall.

== Behavior ==
These birds nest in small colonies; males do not defend territory. The female lays three to five eggs in a grass cup nest on the ground. Both males and females may have more than one mate (polygynandry). The parents, one female and possibly more than one male, feed the young birds.

These birds forage on the ground, gathering in flocks outside of the nesting season. They mainly eat seeds, but preferentially eat insects and spiders in the summer, when these prey become more available. Young birds are mainly fed invertebrates (spiders, insects, snails) but stomach content analysis indicates that nestlings may also swallow plant material which becomes stuck to their mouths.

The song is a sweet warble that is inflected at the end, somewhat reminiscent of the chestnut-sided warbler. The call is a dry rattle, like a shortened version of the call of a female brown-headed cowbird, noticeably drier than that of Lapland longspur.

== Etymology ==
The Smith's longspur was first described in 1831 by naturalist William Swainson, who called it the Painted Bunting, unaware this name belonged to another bird, described by Carl Linnaeus in 1758. In 1844, John James Audubon renamed the bird to its current moniker in honor of his friend, Gideon B. Smith.
