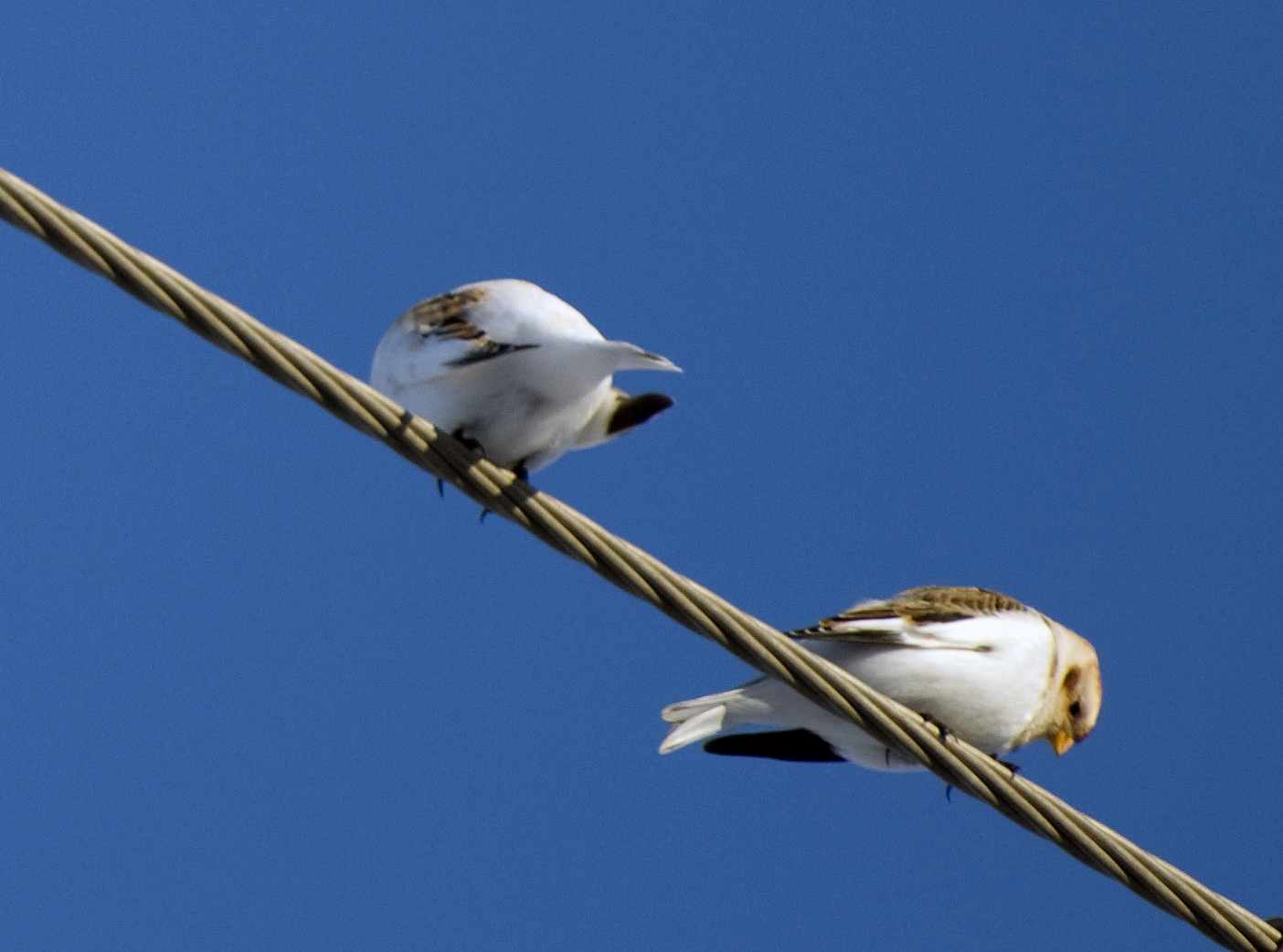

Conservation status
- Least Concern (IUCN 3.1)

Scientific classification
- Kingdom: Animalia
- Phylum: Chordata
- Class: Aves
- Order: Passeriformes
- Family: Calcariidae
- Genus: Plectrophenax
- Species: P. hyperboreus

Binomial name
- Plectrophenax hyperboreus Ridgway, 1884

= McKay's bunting =

Species of bird

McKay's bunting (Plectrophenax hyperboreus) is a passerine bird in the longspur family Calcariidae. It is most closely related to the snow bunting (P. nivalis). Hybrids between the two species have been observed, leading some authorities to treat McKay's as a subspecies of the snow bunting. As the Plectrophenax buntings are nested within the Calcarius clade, their closest relatives are the longspurs. McKay's bunting breeds on two islands in the Bering Sea, St. Matthew and Hall islands, and winters on the western coast of the U.S. state of Alaska.

== Description ==
This species closely resembles snow bunting in all plumages, but is whiter overall. The breeding plumage of the male is almost purely white, with only small areas of black on the wingtips and tail. The breeding female has a streaked back. Non-breeding birds also have warm brown patches on cheeks, crown, and the sides of the neck. McKay's bunting is larger on average than the snow bunting. It is 18 cm (7.1 in) long and weighs from 38 to 62 g (1.3 to 2.2 oz), with an average of 54.5 g (1.92 oz). Among standard measurements, the wing chord is 10.1 to 12.2 cm (4.0 to 4.8 in), the tail is 6.4 to 7.5 cm (2.5 to 3.0 in), the bill is 1.1 to 1.3 cm (0.43 to 0.51 in) and the tarsus is 2 to 2.4 cm (0.79 to 0.94 in).

== Ecology ==
This bunting nests on shingle beaches in hollow drift logs and rock crevices. Winters on coastal marshes, shingle beaches, and agricultural fields. Feeding habits are thought to be similar to snow bunting, which in winter consumes seeds from weeds and grasses, and in summer has a mixed diet of seeds, buds, and insects.

== Status ==
The population of this species is estimated at 19,481 individuals. Although under no immediate threat, it is susceptible to devastation by any introduced rats, weasels or foxes.

The name of this bird honors the American naturalist Charles McKay.
