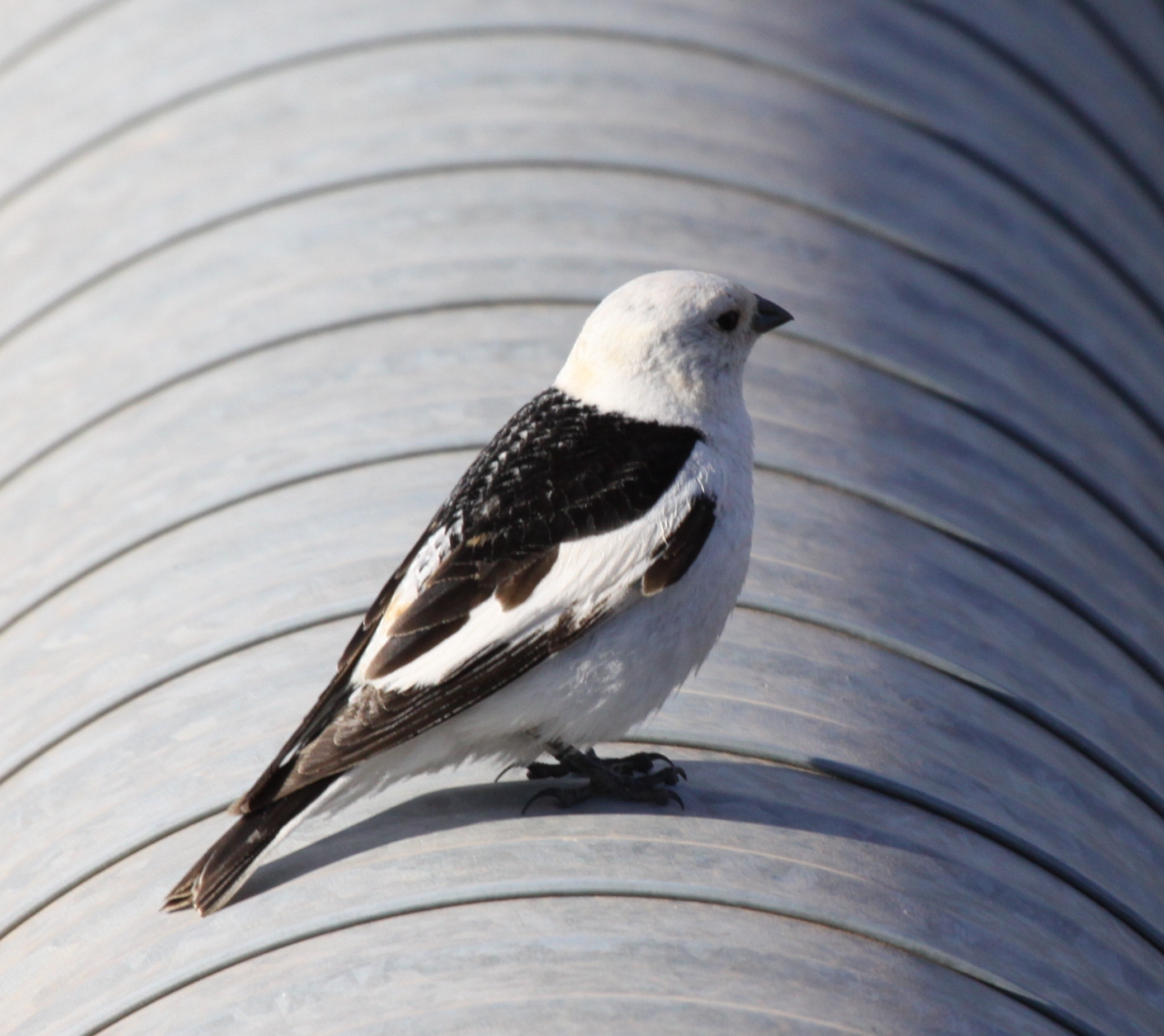
- Male in breeding plumage, Thule, Greenland
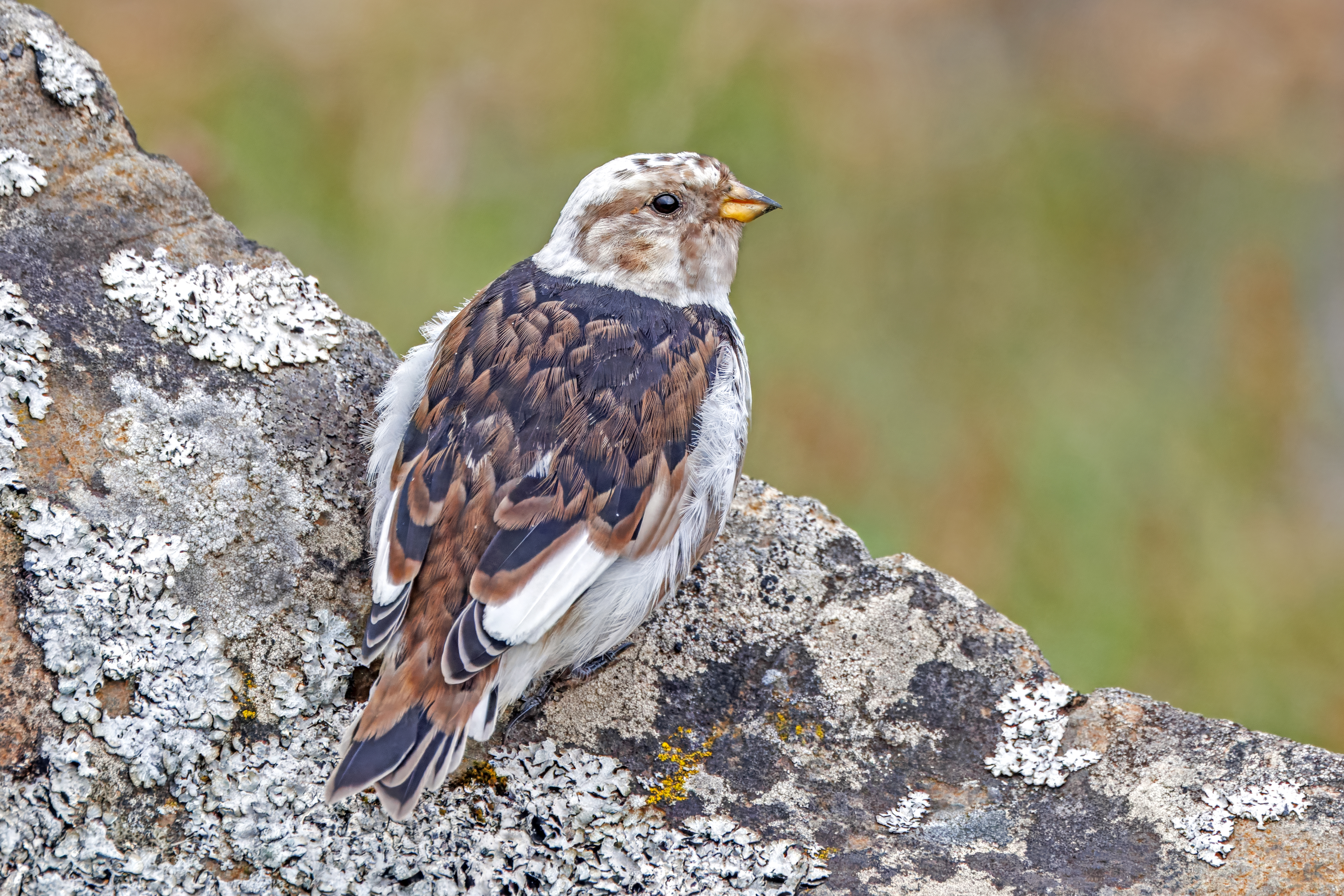
- Female in breeding plumage, Iceland

Conservation status
- Least Concern (IUCN 3.1)

Scientific classification
- Kingdom: Animalia
- Phylum: Chordata
- Class: Aves
- Order: Passeriformes
- Family: Calcariidae
- Genus: Plectrophenax
- Species: P. nivalis

Binomial name
- Plectrophenax nivalis (Linnaeus, 1758)
- Breeding Migration Year-round Nonbreeding

Synonyms
- Emberiza nivalis Linnaeus, 1758; Passerina nivalis (Linnaeus, 1758)

= Snow bunting =

Species of bird

The snow bunting (Plectrophenax nivalis) is a passerine bird in the family Calcariidae. It is an Arctic specialist, with a circumpolar Arctic breeding range throughout the northern hemisphere. There are small isolated populations on a few high mountain tops south of the Arctic region, including the Cairngorms in central Scotland and the Saint Elias Mountains on the southern Alaska-Yukon border, as well as the Cape Breton Highlands. The snow bunting is the most northerly recorded passerine in the world.

== Taxonomy ==
The snow bunting was formally described by the Swedish naturalist Carl Linnaeus in 1758 in the tenth edition of his Systema Naturae. He placed it with the buntings in the genus Emberiza and coined the binomial name Emberiza nivalis. He specified the locality as Lapland. It is now placed in the genus Plectrophenax, described in 1882 by the Norwegian born zoologist Leonhard Stejneger with the snow bunting as the type species. The genus name Plectrophenax is from Ancient Greek plektron, "cock's spur", and phenax "imposter", and the specific nivalis is Latin for "snow-white".

The snow bunting was formerly classified in the family Emberizidae, which included American sparrows, buntings, towhees and finches. All these species came into existence after a broad geologically recent radiation of passerine birds. However, it is now part of the narrower family Calcariidae, which also contains the longspurs. Despite the wide distribution of this species there are only very small differences between different phenotypes.

Four subspecies are accepted, which differ slightly in the plumage pattern of breeding males:

- Plectrophenax nivalis nivalis (Linnaeus, 1758) – Arctic Europe, Arctic North America. Head white, rump mostly black with a small area of white.
- Plectrophenax nivalis insulae Salomonsen, 1931 – Iceland, Faroe Islands, Scotland. Head white with a blackish collar, rump black.
- Plectrophenax nivalis vlasowae Portenko, 1937 – Arctic Asia. Head white, rump mostly white.
- Plectrophenax nivalis townsendi Ridgway, 1887 – Aleutian Islands, Kamchatka, coastal far eastern Siberia. As vlasowae, but slightly larger.

It is very closely related to the Beringian McKay's bunting (Plectrophenax hyperboreus), which differs in having even more white in the plumage. Hybrids between the two occur in Alaska, and they have been considered conspecific by some authors, though they are currently generally treated as separate species.

A hybrid with a Lapland longspur was photographed at St. Lewis Inlet, Newfoundland and Labrador, Canada, during spring migration in April 2011.

== Description ==
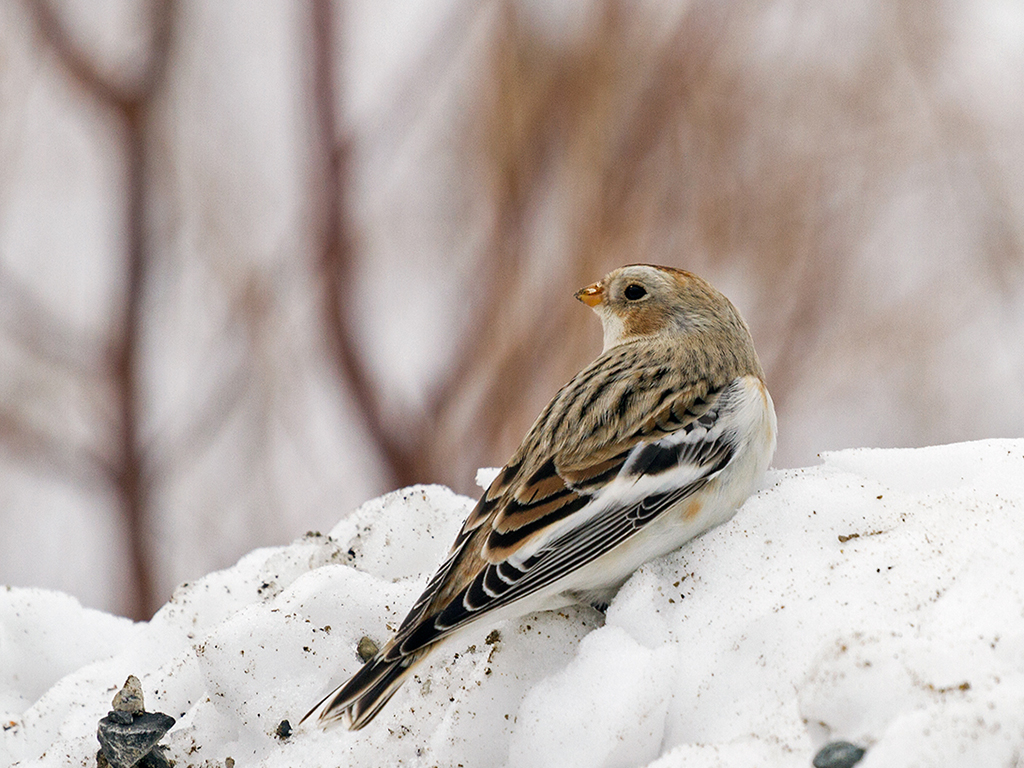
A female snow bunting wintering atop Mount Agamenticus in York, Maine

The snow bunting is a sexually dimorphic, medium-sized passerine bird. It is ground-dwelling, and walks, runs and can hop if needed. It is fairly large and long-winged for a bunting. It measures 15 cm with a wingspan of 32–38 cm (13–15 in) and weights 30 to 40 grams. The bill is normally yellow with a black tip, however in males, the bill is all black in the summer. The plumage is white underneath and the wings and back have black and white on them. The female and male have different plumage; during the breeding season, the male is white with black wingtips and a black back, while the female has black wingtips and the black feathers on the back fringed with brown. During the winter, they both have broad orangey-brown fringes on the back feathers. In the spring, the buntings do not moult as many other passerines do; instead the breeding colours come with the wearing and abrasion of the brown fringes to show just the black centres of the feathers. Unlike most passerines, it has feathered tarsi, an adaptation to its harsh cold environment. No other passerine can winter as far north as this species, apart from the common raven.

This species is easily confused with McKay's bunting due to the similarity of their plumage and the occurrence of hybrids. It can also be confused with the Lapland longspur, which differs mainly in having minimal white in the wing; their calls are similar, but the snow bunting has more 'liquid' rippling tone, while Lapland longspur has a drier, more rattling tone. Another species that it may occur with is the horned lark, although that has a conspicuous black-and-yellow head pattern, a longer, partly black tail and no white on the wings.

=== Vocalizations ===
Snow bunting's song

The call is a distinctive rippling whistle, per,r,r,rit, and the song is a brief but loud warble hudidi feet feet feew hudidi.

Snow buntings use vocalizations to communicate among each other and males will have a song to attract the female. The communication calls are done by both the male and the female and they tend to be emitted in flight or in the ground, while the males will often emit the song from a perching position or in a flight display. The males will start singing as soon as they will reach the breeding grounds, and will stop once they find a mate. Studies have shown that the quality and the rate at which a song is emitted affect the reproductive success of a male. The rate of a song measured by the number of strophes per minute is limited by the foraging needs of the male; therefore, a male that is able to sing more frequently shows that he is more successful and effective in his foraging behaviour. The song becomes an indicator of the parental care qualities of the male, since having an effective foraging behaviour will provide a better probability of survival of the nestlings. Females will then choose their mates based on their song rate. Within snow buntings, vocalizations in males are unique to each individual, although there is certain syllable sharing between one another. The uniqueness of each song reveals a capacity of recognition between individuals and has an effect in the individual fitness and reproductive success. The songs have duration of 2 seconds and have a frequency of 2 to 6 kHz. Each song is composed of similar and dissimilar figures that create different motifs that will alternate and repeat, resulting in a unique pattern for every male individual.

== Distribution and habitat ==
The snow bunting lives in very high latitudes in the Arctic tundra. There is no apparent limit to its northern range, while the southern range is limited by the duration of daylight, which influences their reproductive activity. This species is found in the high Arctic tundra of North America, Ellesmere Island, Iceland, higher mountains of Scotland, Norway, Russia, North Greenland, Siberia, Novaya Zemlya, and Franz Josef Land. During the winter, this bird migrates to the circumglobal northern temperate zone including the south of Canada, the northern United States, the coasts and plains of northern Europe in Great Britain, the Netherlands, Germany, Poland, Ukraine, and east to central Asia. During the last ice age, the snow bunting was widespread throughout continental Europe.

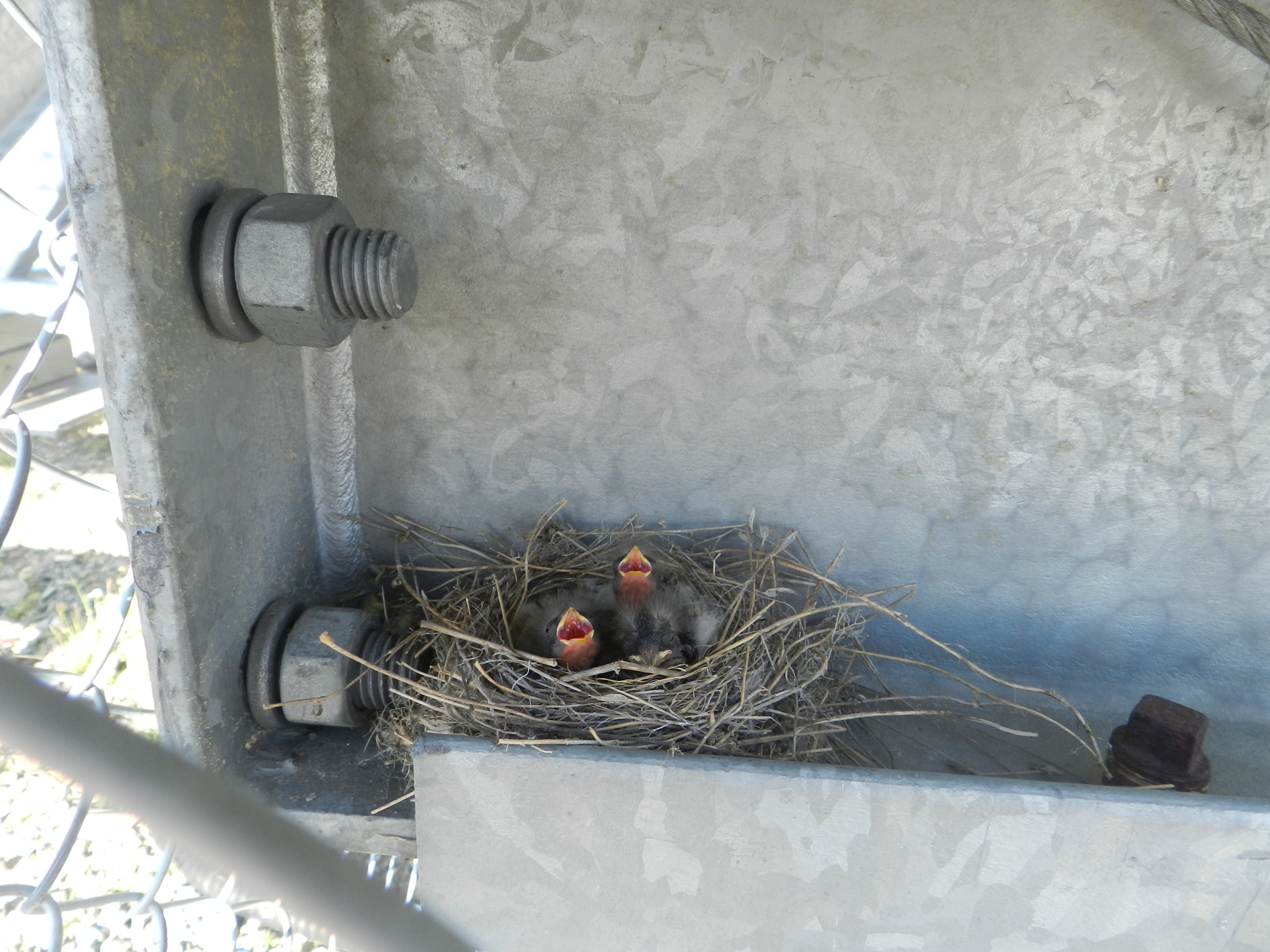
Snow bunting young using a building as protection

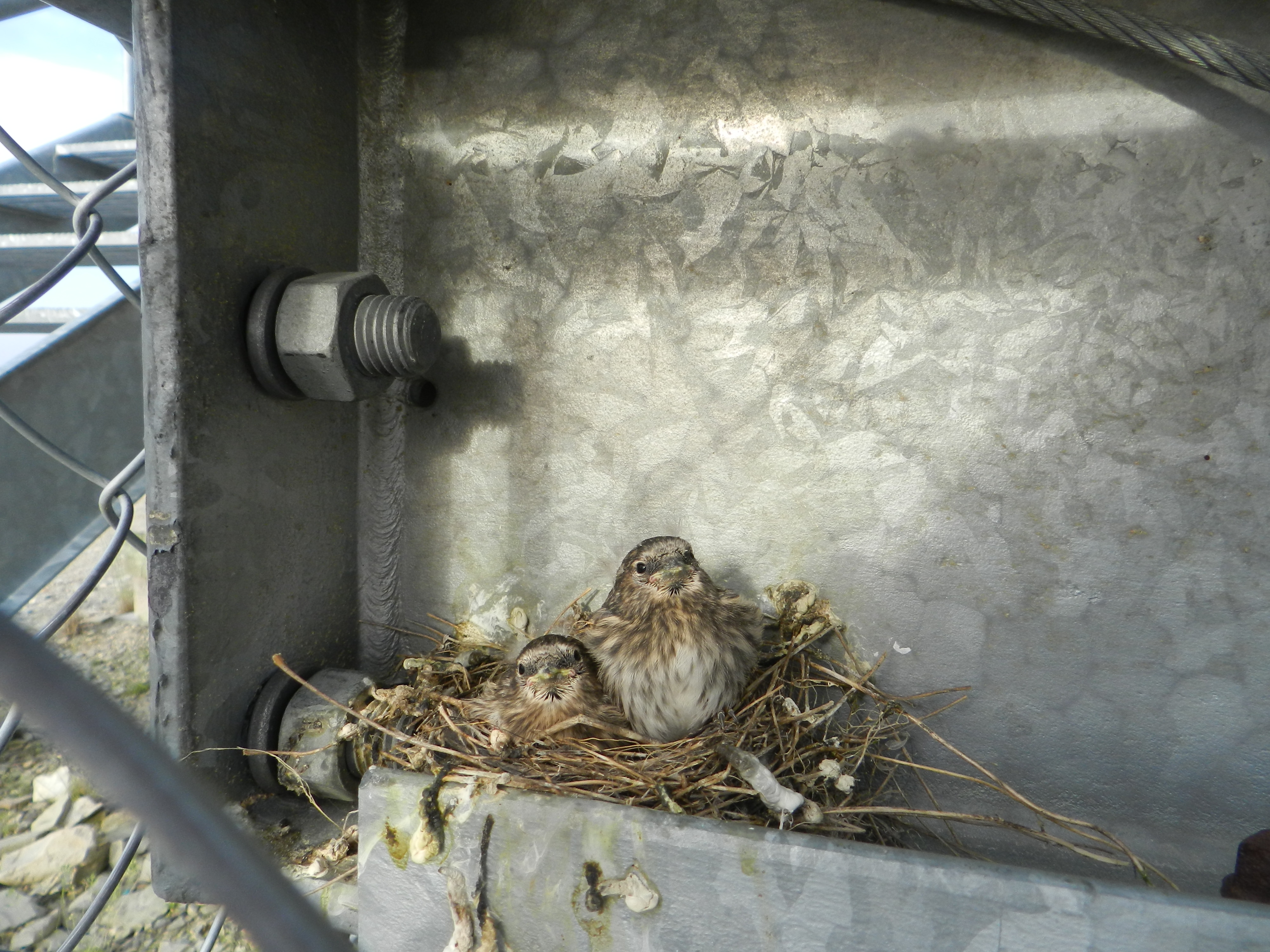
The same chicks eight days later

During the breeding period, the snow bunting looks for rocky habitats in the Arctic. Since the vegetation in the tundra is low growing, this bird and its nestlings are exposed to predators, and in order to ensure the survival of its offspring, the snow bunting nests in cavities in order to protect the nestlings from any threat. During this period, buntings also look for a habitat rich in vegetation such as wet sedge meadows and areas rich in dryas and lichens. In the winter, they seek open habitats such as farms, barren fields, and lakeshores, where they feed on seeds in the ground.

=== Migration ===
The snow buntings migrate to the Arctic to breed and they are the first migrant species that arrives in these territories. The males will arrive first at the beginning of April, when the temperature can reach as low as −30 °C (−22 °F). This early migration could be explained by the fact that this species is highly territorial and the quality of the nesting area is crucial to their reproductive success. Females will arrive four to six weeks later, when the snow starts to melt. They tend to migrate in small flocks and have an undulating flight at a moderate height.

The birds overwinter in northern temperate zones in open fields and forms moving flocks that can number into the hundreds. They will leave the Arctic at the middle and end of September, although some will start the migration at the beginning of November. The female leaves first and tends to winter in more southern territories than the male, while the juveniles will leave the Arctic even later than the adults. Once the snow bunting migrates south, they are able to lose the weight they had gained for breeding.

The migration is nocturnal and the birds are able to detect the geomagnetic field of the Earth in order to guide themselves to their breeding and overwinter territory. The orientation of the snow bunting during migration is independent of any type of visual cue. Furthermore, studies have shown that only those individuals with adequate energy storage will be able to select seasonally appropriate directions during their migration.

=== Physiological adaptations ===
Right before the breeding season, snow buntings undergo significant physiological changes to prepare for their journey to higher Arctic regions. One of the most obvious changes is an increase in body weight. They undergo the process of hyperphagia, or increased food take, which builds up their fat reserves. Their overall fat mass increases by 30%, while their lean mass decreases by 15%. The size of their pectoralis muscle also increases so that they can increase shivering thermogenesis through muscle contractions. As they reach the Arctic, snow buntings must be ready to engage in breeding and courtship. Their fat reserves also provide energy for reproduction during this time. Once the breeding season is over, snow buntings lose most of their extra fat to fly back to the southern regions where they continue to live until next season.

== Behaviour ==
=== Food and feeding ===
From the fall to the spring the snow bunting eats a variety of weeds such as knotweed, ragweed, amaranth, goosefoot, aster, and goldenrod and also eats various types of grass seeds. During this season it will forage in the snow collecting seeds from lower stems. During the summer their diet includes seeds of crowberry, bilberry, bistort, dock, poppy, purple saxifrage and invertebrates such as butterflies, true bugs, flies, wasps and spiders. The nestlings are fed exclusively on invertebrates. Snow buntings also prey on basking spiders by throwing rocks around and less regularly they will try to catch invertebrates in flight.

=== Breeding ===
Snow buntings have a monogamous behaviour in which the males have a positive impact in the reproductive success of the female, although they are not essential to the survival of the nestling. The male will follow the female during her fertile period to make sure that she will not mate with any other male. The nest sites provide safety but bring other challenges to snow buntings, since in rock cracks and fissures the microclimate could be harsh, the incubation time might be longer for this species and there is a risk that the lower temperatures kill the embryo. To overcome this challenge, the male will bring food to the female during the incubation time, in this way she will be able to constantly control the temperatures of the nest microclimate improving the hatching success and reducing the incubation time.

It lays its eggs as soon as the ambient temperature is above 0 °C (32 °F). The eggs are blue-green, spotted brown, and hatch in 12–13 days, and the young are already ready to fly after a further 12–14 days.

==== Courtship behaviour ====
The courtship behaviour of snow buntings varies in different parts of the world. In Greenland, the male will have a threat display to defend his territory. This display will consist of very loud calls, the male will lower its head down and will turn completely to face the newcomer. The males will also have a ceremonial flight to attract the female, in which they will reach a height of 10–15 m (33–49 ft), then they will glide, they will sing the song very loudly and will then keep on singing from a perching position.

== Effects of climate change on snow bunting populations ==
Several indices suggest that climate change could potentially have an important impact on the snow bunting's populations. The Arctic oscillation index (AO) is a regional climate index that helps to predict ecological processes. In the Arctic, when the AO index is in a positive phase, there are higher winter temperatures and precipitation, followed by an earlier and warmer spring, and the summer is cloudy and humid with lower temperatures. Usually the AO index tends to oscillate from a positive to a negative phase, but during the last past 40 years, the AO index has remained in the positive phase. Studies have shown that warmer springs trigger an early breeding behaviour in the snow buntings that mismatches the peak of their food sources, leading to a lower success rate of the hatchlings. Even more, the higher temperatures will bring to the Arctic other species that will compete with the snow bunting. It is also thought that higher temperatures might allow greater survival of second broods in the snow bunting species.

== Gallery ==
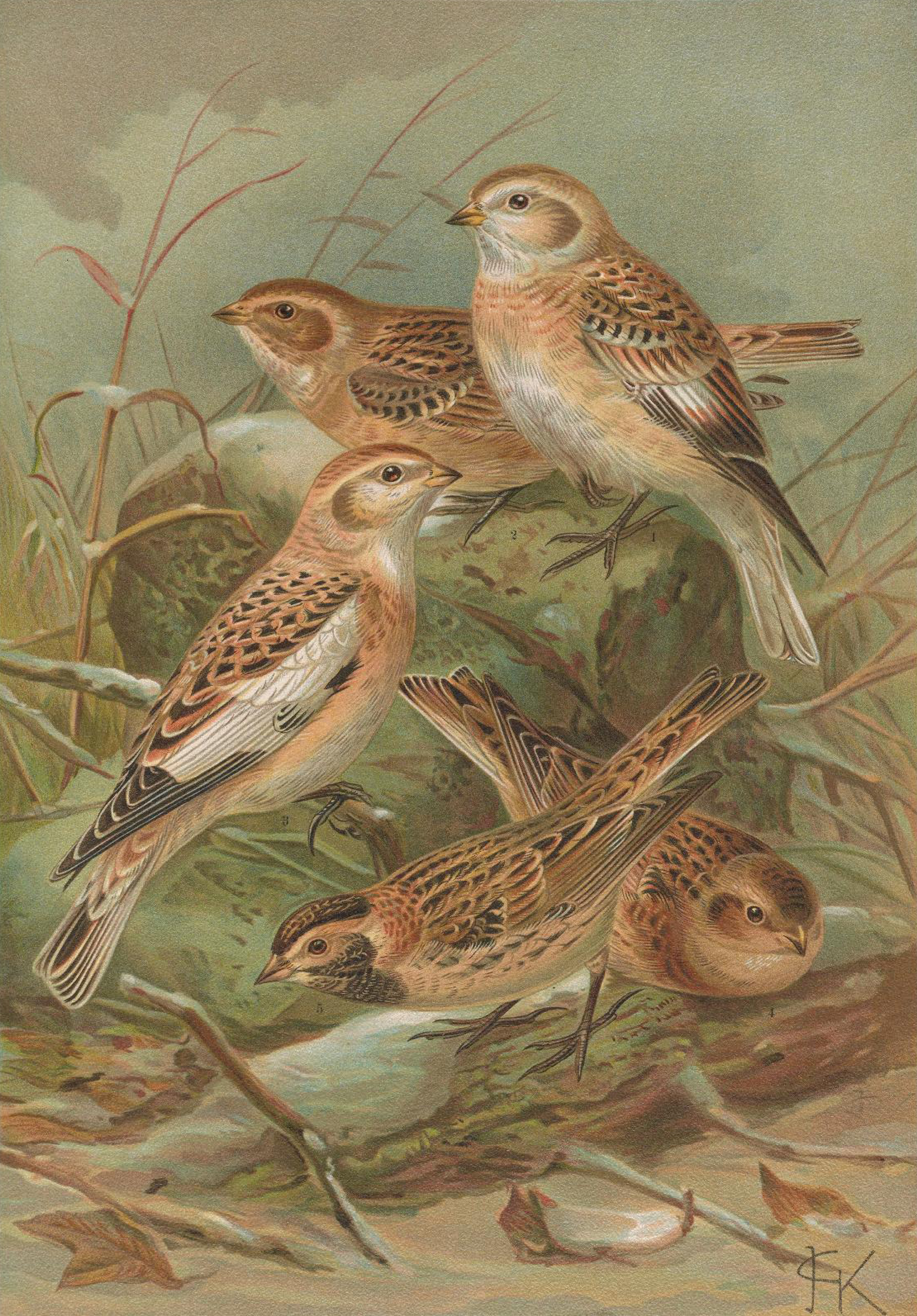
Illustration of adult and juvenile snow buntings by John Gerrard Keulemans, 1905

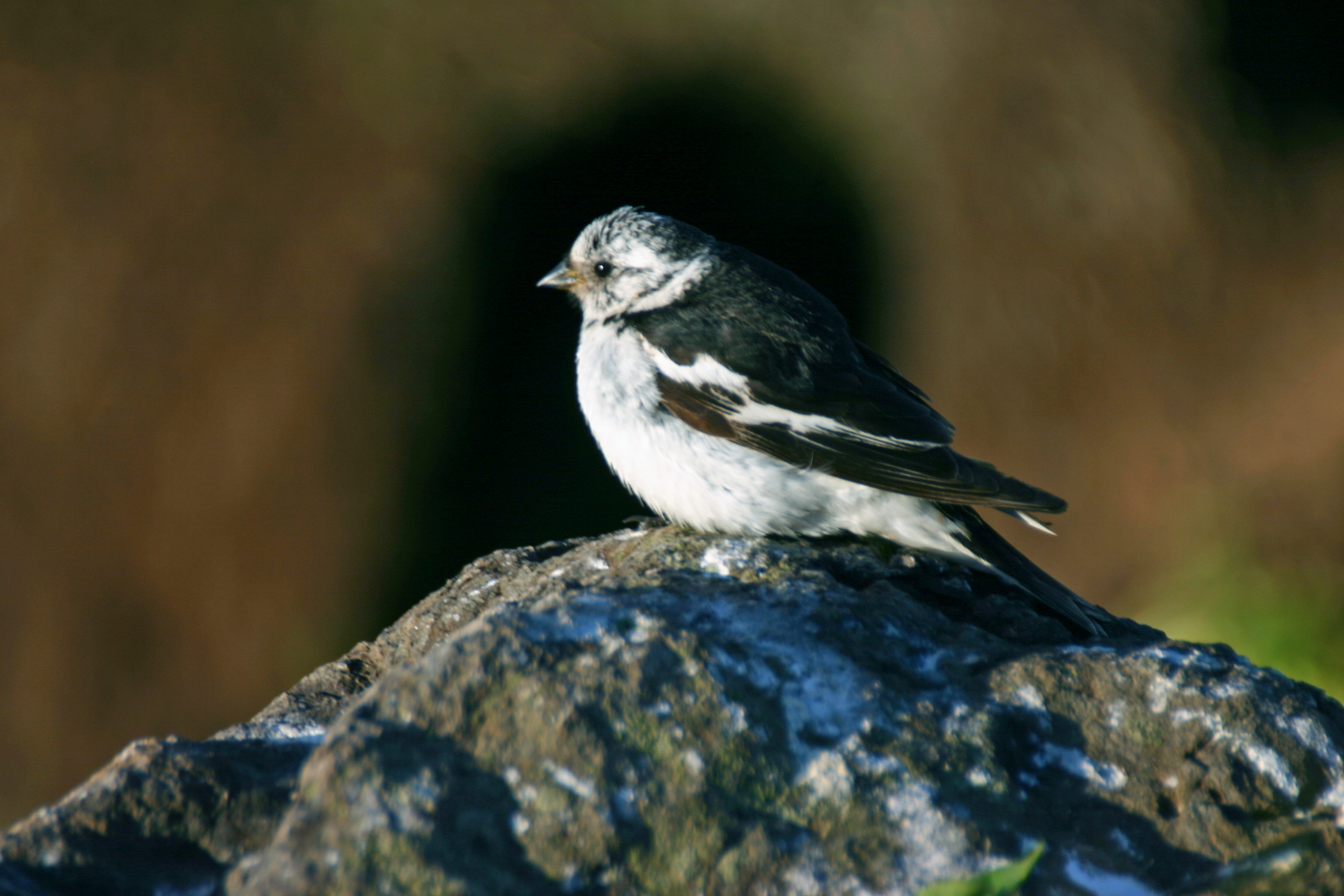
Adult breeding male P. n. insulae, Iceland

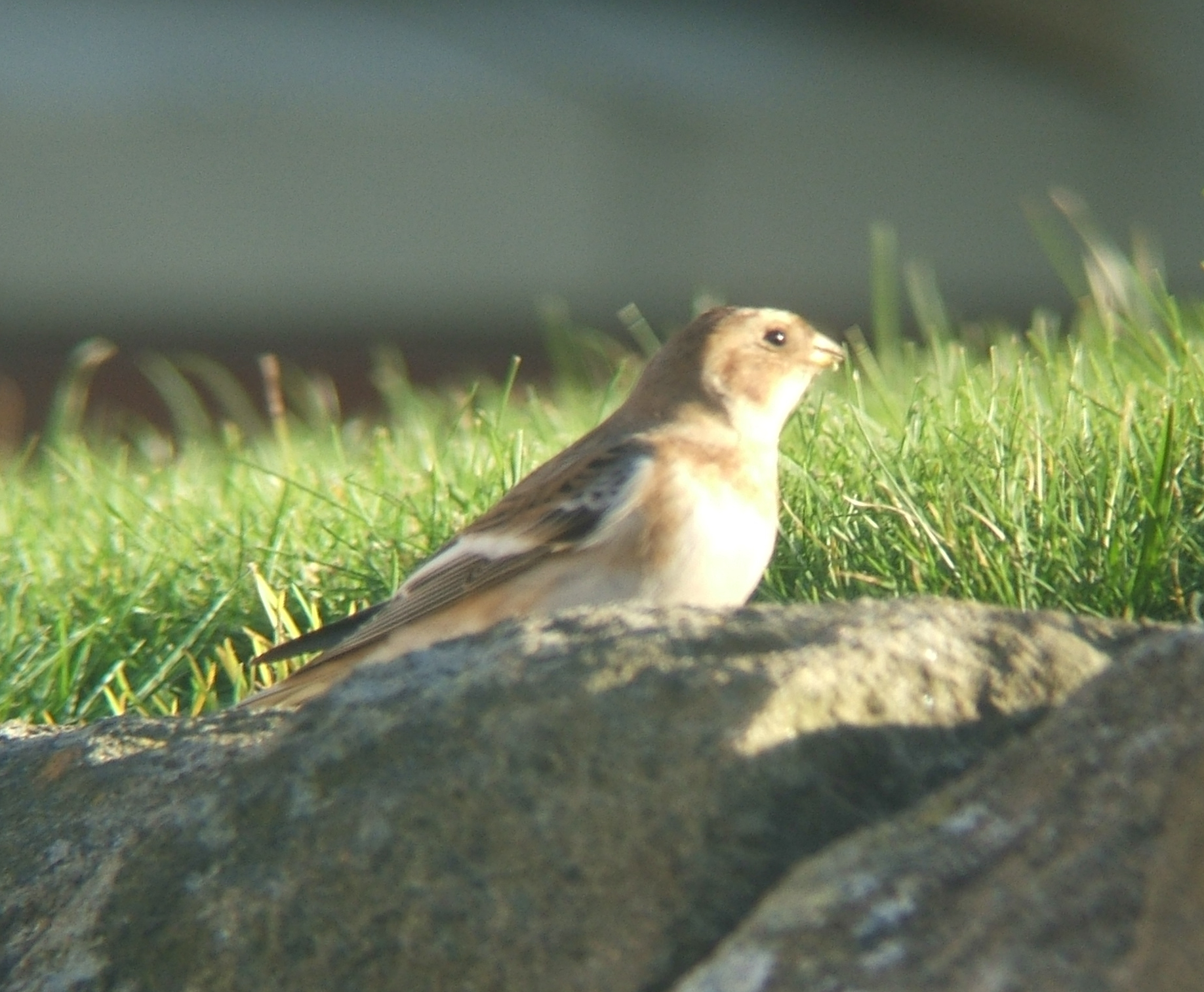
Adult winter male, England

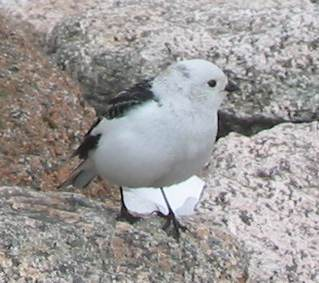
Adult breeding male, Scotland

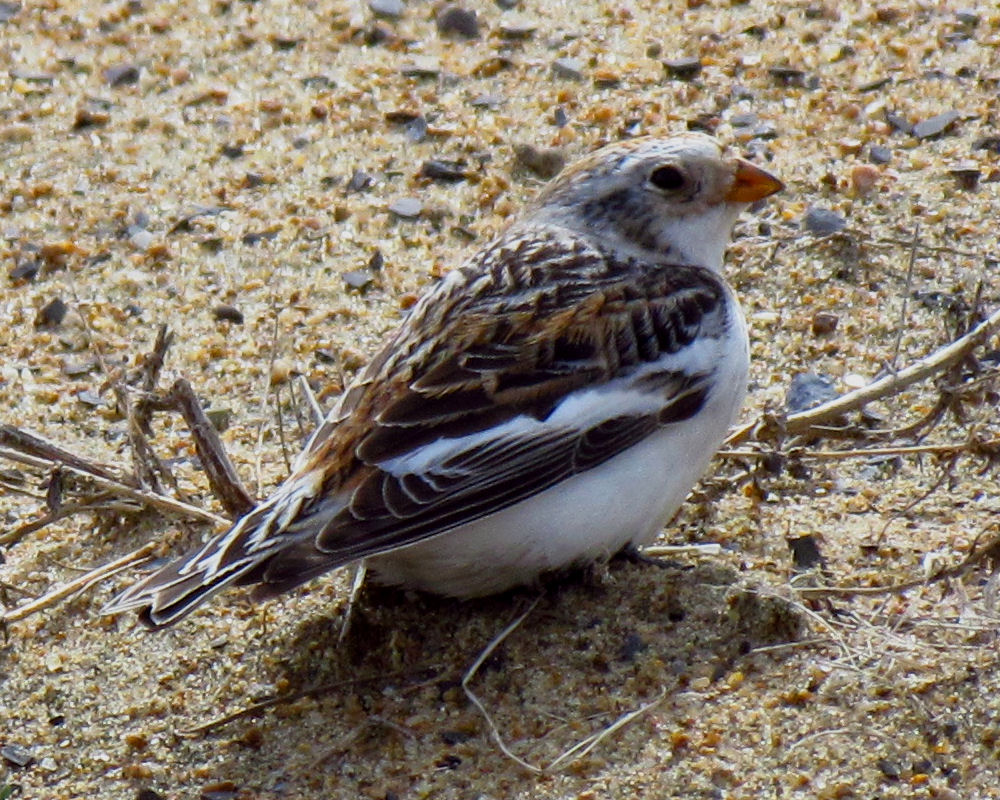
P. n. nivalis, in spring

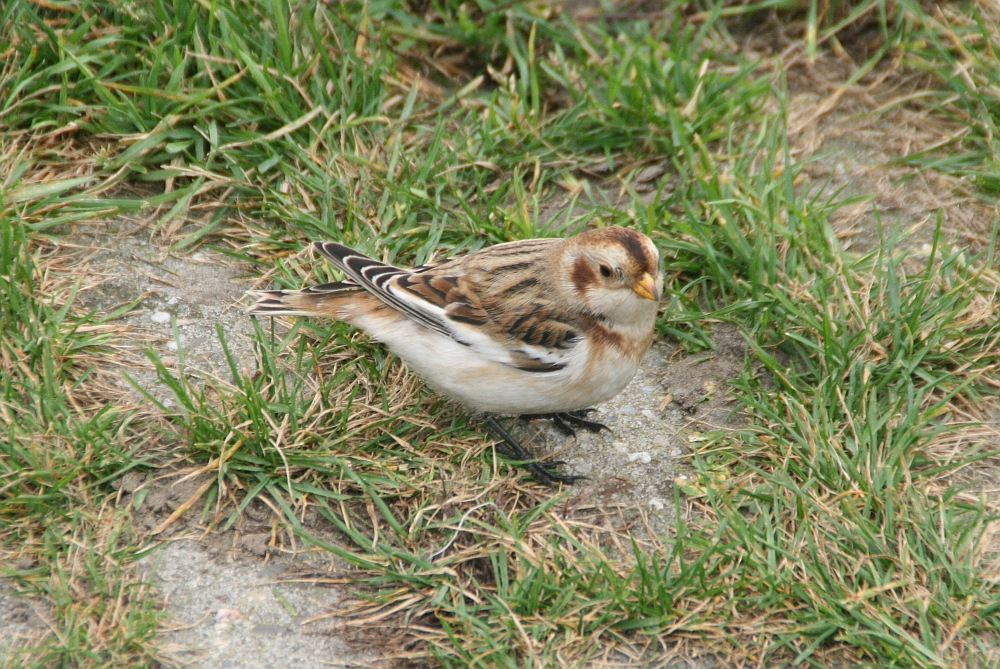
Adult in winter plumage, Germany

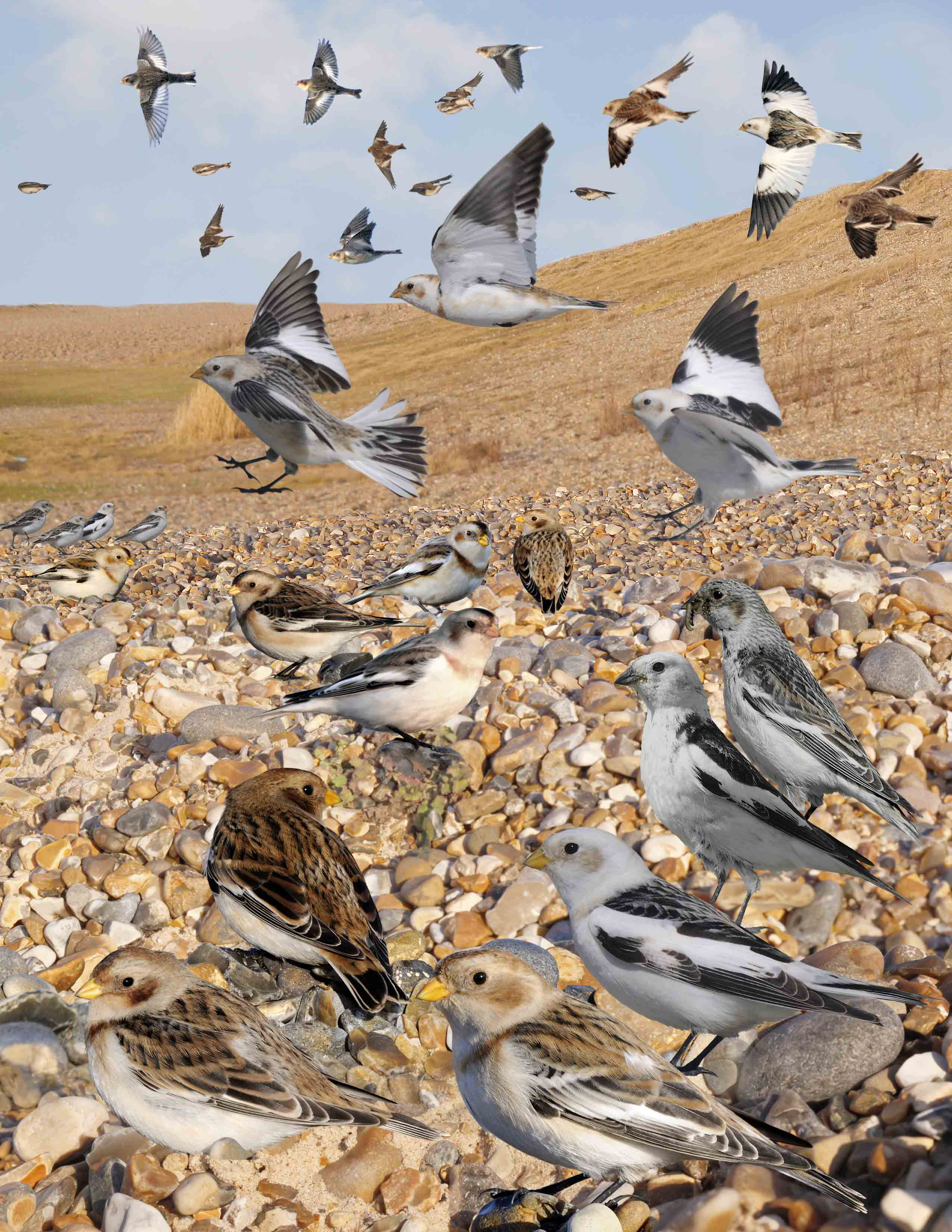
ID composite

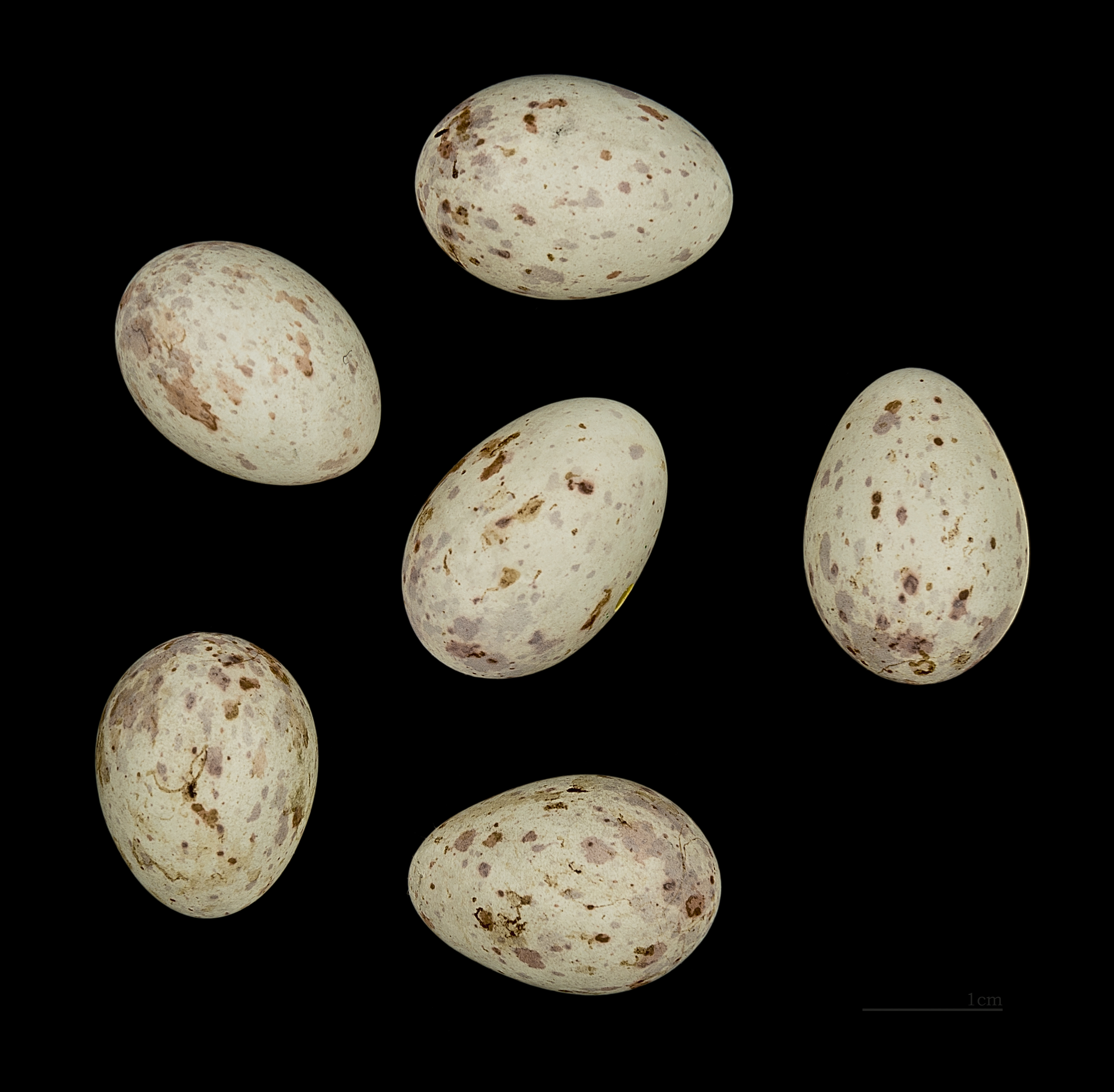
Eggs of snow bunting MHNT

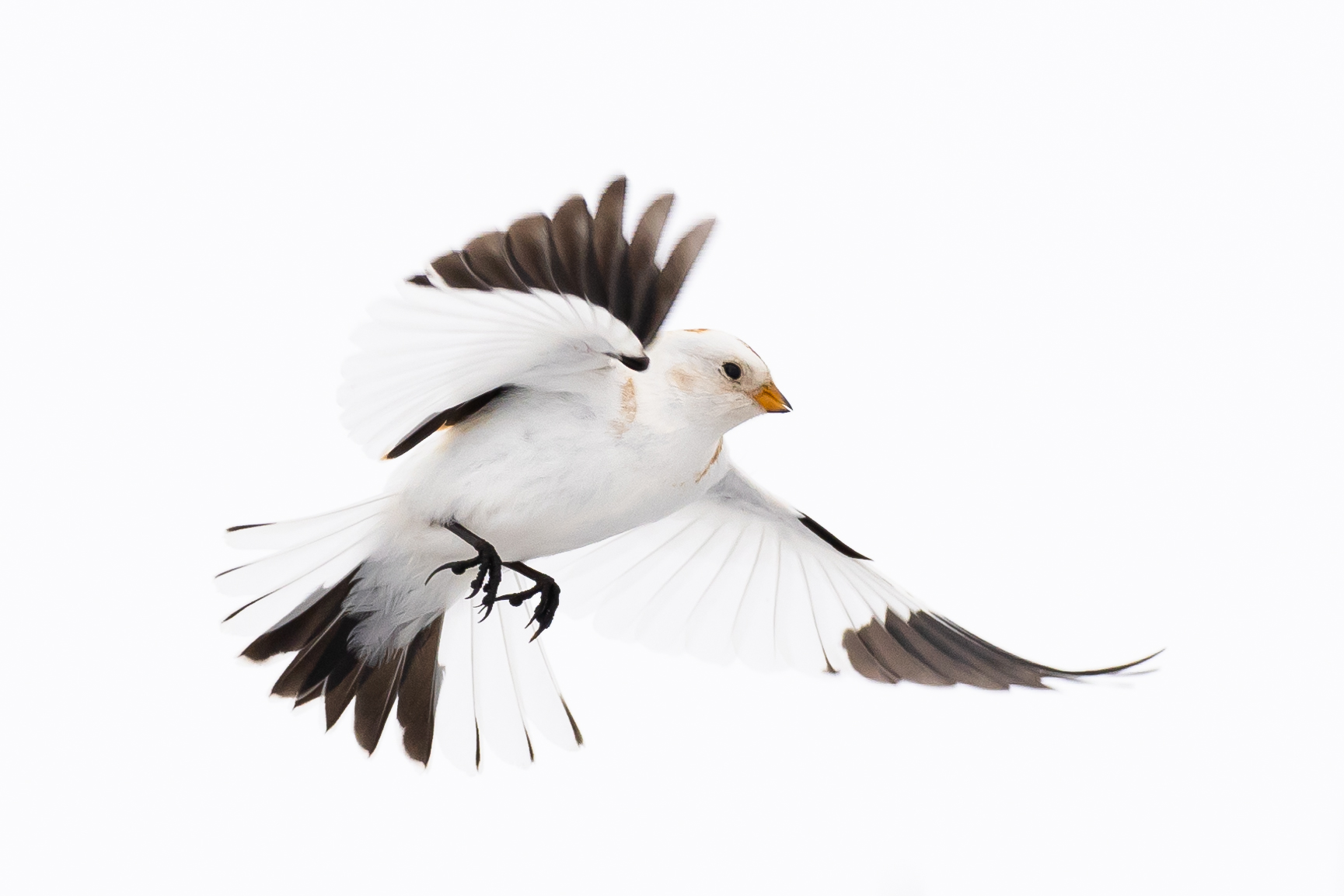
In flight, Alaska
