= John Stuart Skinner =

American lawyer and publisher (1788–1851)

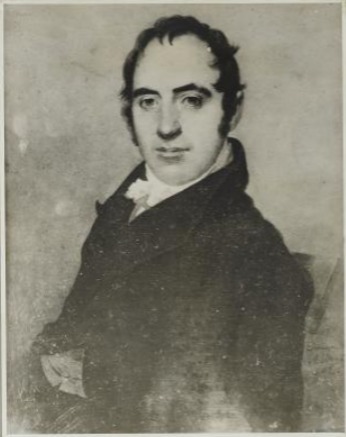
c. 1825

John Stuart Skinner (22 February 1788 – 21 March 1851) was an American purser for the navy, post master, and the founder and editor of several magazines dealing with agriculture and outdoor life. The magazines he began promoted new agricultural industry including sericulture, horse breeding, cattle rearing and sport hunting. He has been considered as the founder of agricultural journalism in the US.

== Life and work ==
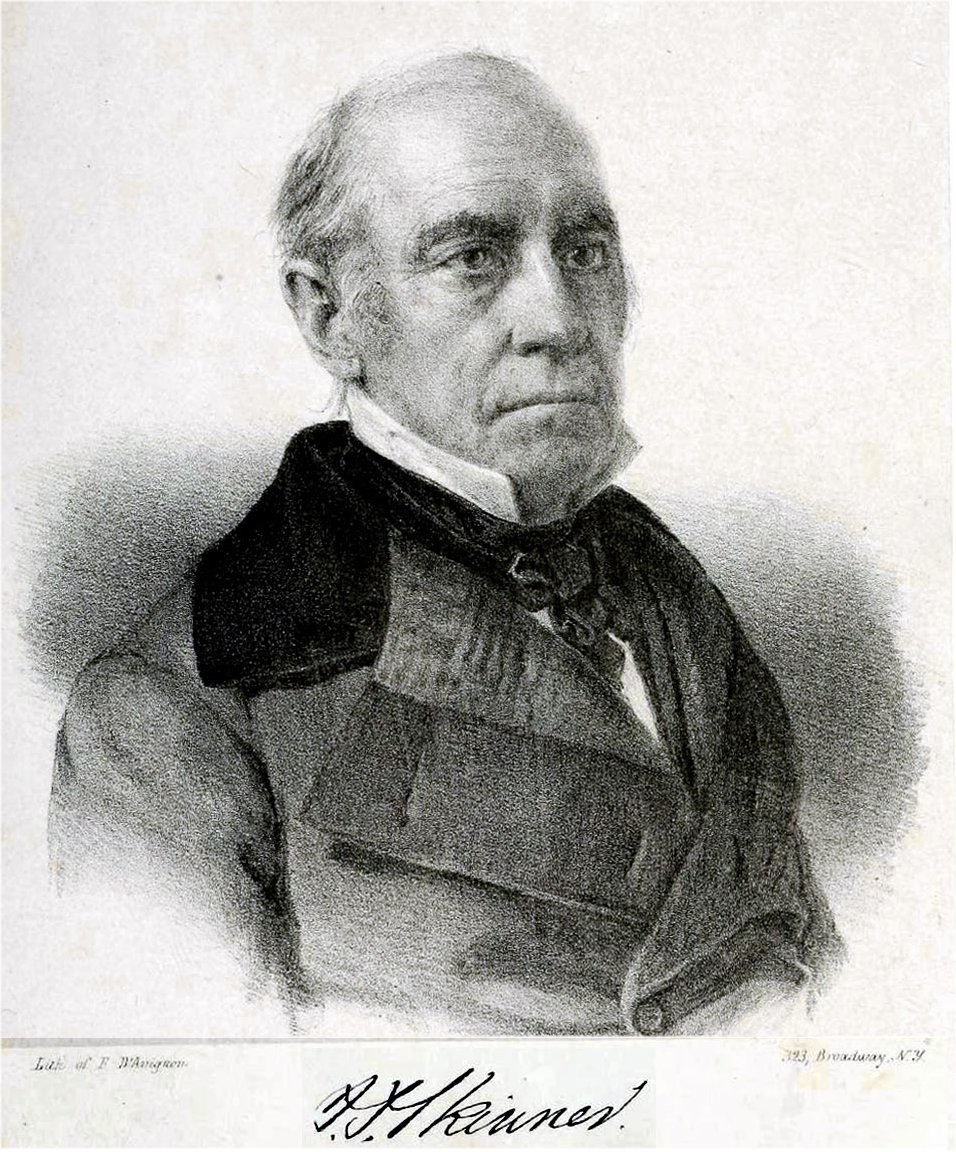

Skinner was born in Calvert County, Maryland where his ancestors had settled from England. He went to country schools and then to Charlotte Hall, St. Mary's county after which he worked at Annapolis in a county court. He studied law after which he became an attorney. In 1813 he was appointed as an agent for prisoner exchange by President James Madison. In 1813 he served as a purser in the navy at Baltimore. In August 1814 he rode 90 miles at night to warn of British troops moving to Washington. Subsequently, Skinner was sent along with Francis Scott Key to negotiate the release of Maryland physician William Beanes. Skinner obtained letters from British prisoners stating that they were treated well and was able to impress Major General Robert Ross to release Dr Beanes. They were however held aboard a British ship just off Fort McHenry and it was during that time that Key would compose what became the US national anthem. In 1816, Skinner was appointed postmaster of Baltimore. He held the position until 1849. In 1819 he founded an agricultural periodical The American Farmer that gained wide support and he soon became an expert on agricultural matters and on outdoor sports. In 1824 he was chosen to manage a 20,000 acre farm gifted to General Lafayette. In 1829 he started another periodical American Turf Register and Sporting Magazine after which he sold the American Farmer to I. Irvine Hitchcock and Co. under the editorship of Gideon B. Smith. In 1839 he sold off the Turf Register as well and in 1845 began yet another called the Farmer's Library and Monthly Journal of Agriculture. He has been considered as a founding figure in agricultural journalism in the US.

Skinner married Elizabeth Glen Davies, step-daughter of Chancellor Theodorick Bland, and they had a son Frederick Gustavus (1814–1894) who went to France when he was twelve and grew up under the care of General Lafayette at his estate La Grange. Skinner was sent to France for two years. His son returned to the US and became a colonel in the 1st Virginia Infantry during the civil war. He left the regiment following injury. Colonel Skinner also took an interest in dogs and guns and became an editor for the Turf, Field, and Farm. Skinner died after accidentally falling into the cellar of the post office he worked in. The family are buried at Westminster Cemetery, Baltimore.
