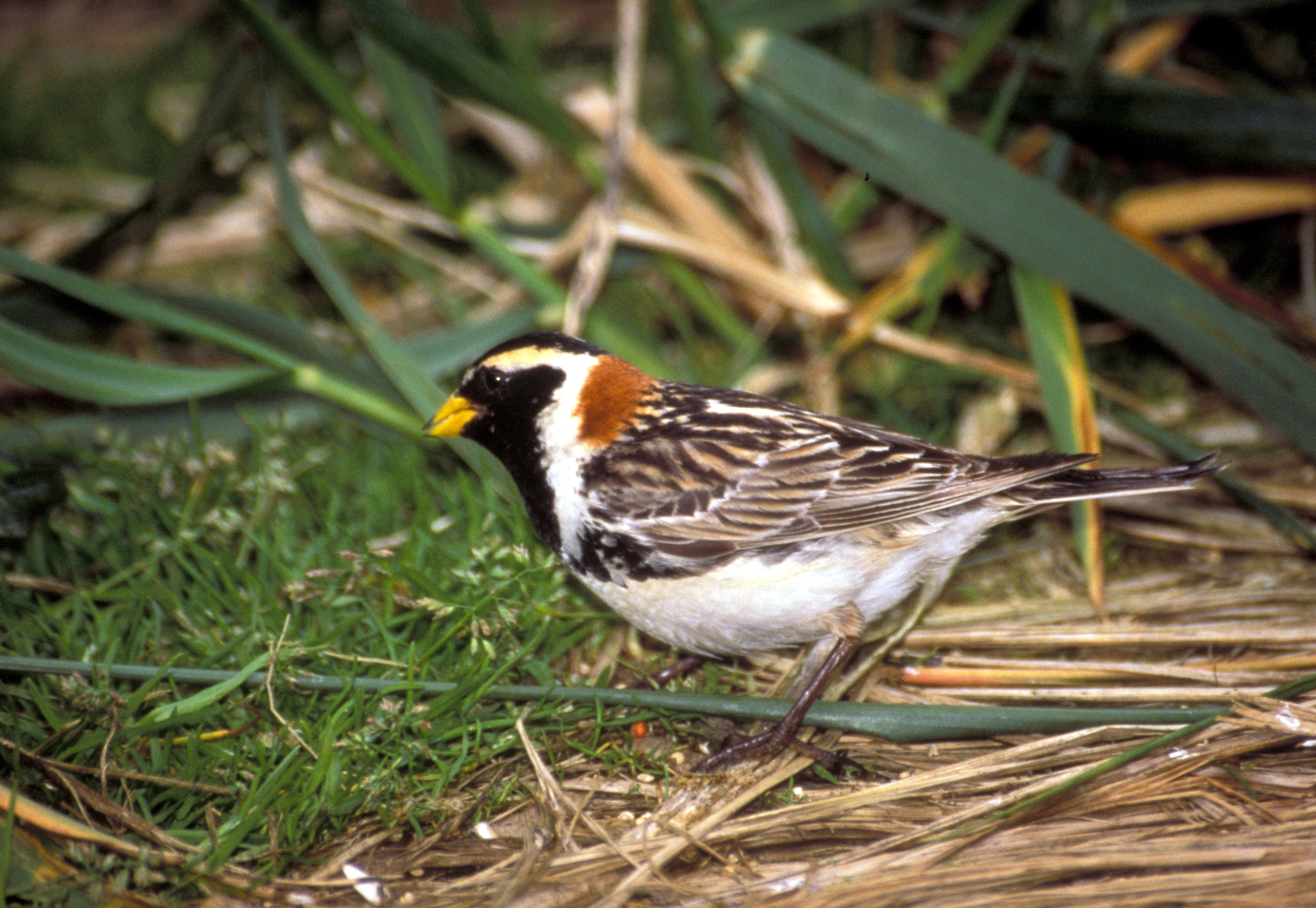
- Lapland longspur (Calcarius lapponicus)

Scientific classification
- Kingdom: Animalia
- Phylum: Chordata
- Class: Aves
- Order: Passeriformes
- Superfamily: Emberizoidea
- Family: Calcariidae; Ridgway, 1901

Genera
- Calcarius; Plectrophenax; Rhynchophanes

= Calcariidae =

Family of birds

Calcariidae is a small family of passerine birds. It includes longspurs and snow buntings. There are six species in three genera worldwide, found mainly in North America and Eurasia. They are migratory and can live in a variety of habitats including grasslands, prairies, tundra, mountains, and beaches.

== Description ==
Members of Calcariidae range in mass from around 20 grams (0.71 oz) (the chestnut-collared longspur) to around 42 grams (1.5 oz) (McKay's bunting). Species have brown, grey, and white plumage, with dark brown or black irises. The legs of the snow bunting and McKay's bunting are dark gray or black, while legs of other species in the family range from dull pink to brown.

== Taxonomy ==
The birds in Calcariidae were formerly assigned to the family Emberizidae (typically known as buntings in the Old World and sparrows in the New World). A 2008 phylogenetic study by Alström and colleagues confirmed that the members of this family form a clade quite separated from the Emberizidae, with affinities instead with the New World warblers (Parulidae), cardinals (Cardinalidae) or tanagers (Thraupidae), though their exact relationships are unclear. They proposed to place them in the tribe Calcariini, but the International Ornithological Congress has placed them in a separate family in 2010. Timing with the cytochrome b DNA suggests that the Calcariidae diverged from a common ancestor around 4.2–6.2 million years ago, around the beginning of the Pliocene, possibly soon after spread of grasslands in North America as the climate in the late Miocene became drier and cooler.

=== Genera and species ===
Three genera—Calcarius (longspurs), Plectrophenax (snow-buntings), and Rhynchophanes—are recognised. Genetic analysis with cytochrome b DNA showed that the thick-billed longspur was most closely related to the two snow bunting species, and the three nested within the genus Calcarius. Smith's and the chestnut-collared longspur were each other's closest relatives (sister taxa). The Lapland longspur likely diverged from an ornatus/pictus ancestor near the beginning of the Pliocene (4.4–6.2 million years ago) and the snow and McKay's buntings diverged within the last 100,000–125,000 years. Though they differ in appearance, Smith's and the collared longspurs likely only diverged around 1.5–2 million years ago, around the start of the Pleistocene.

McKay's bunting is sometimes considered a subspecies of the snow bunting, and instances of the two species hybridizing have been reported. However, a 2007 study by Maley and Winker found substantial differences in the juvenile plumage between the two groups, supporting a species-level division. Other members of Calcariidae known to hybridize with each other are the thick-billed longspur and the chestnut-collared longspur.

Image	Genus	Living species
	Calcarius Bechstein, 1802	Lapland longspur (Calcarius lapponicus); Smith's longspur (Calcarius pictus); Chestnut-collared longspur (Calcarius ornatus)
	Plectrophenax Stejneger, 1882	Snow bunting (Plectrophenax nivalis); McKay's bunting (Plectrophenax hyperboreus)
	Rhynchophanes Baird, 1858	Thick-billed longspur (Rhynchophanes mccownii)

== Distribution and habitat ==
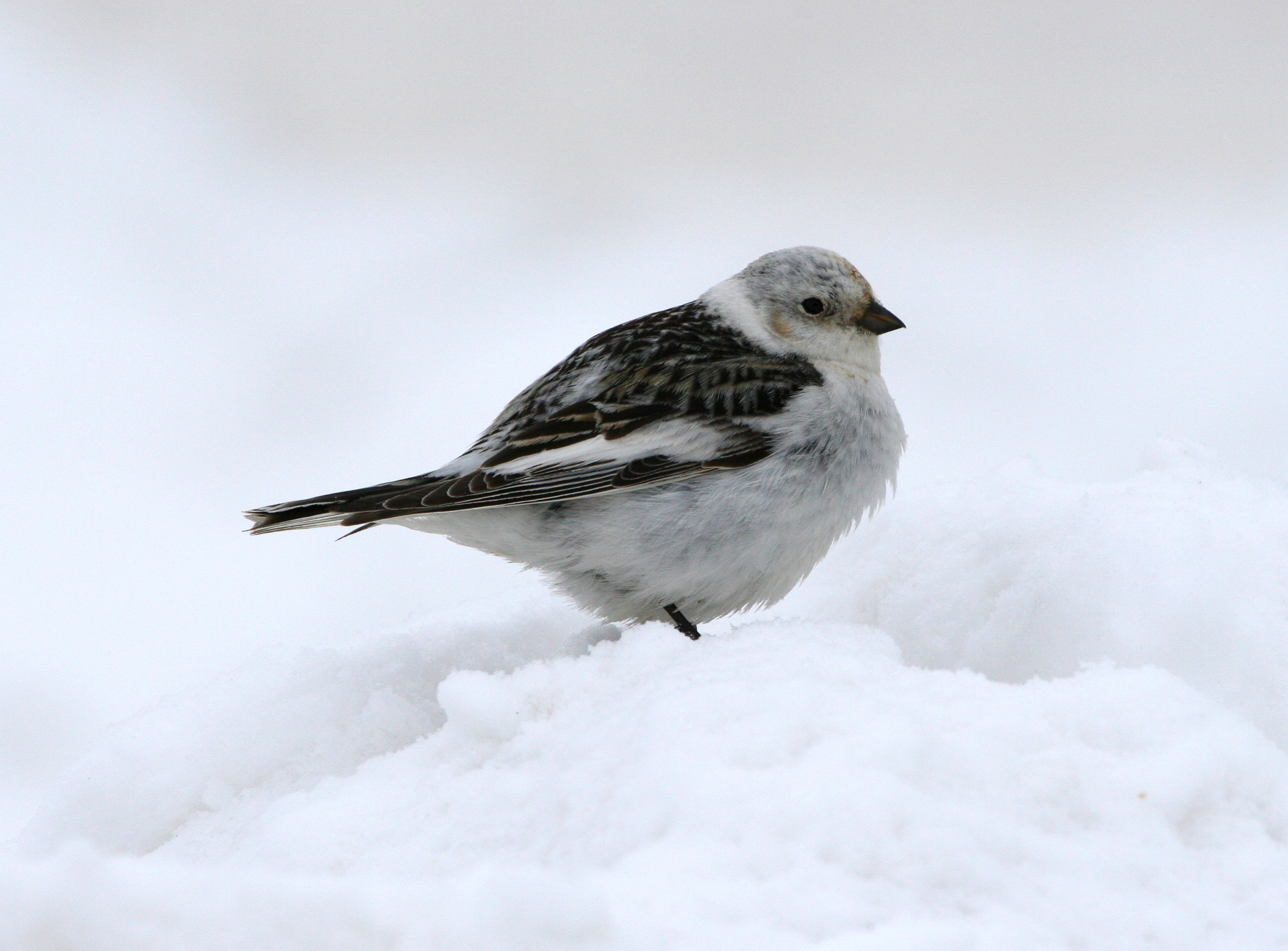
A snow bunting in Alaska. This species breeds mainly in the Arctic tundra and winters in northern temperate areas.

The range of the family is extensive. Of the six species within the family, the snow bunting and Lapland longspur are found both in both North America and Eurasia; the other four species are found only in North America. The snow bunting breeds in northern latitudes in an extensive breeding range which consists of northern Alaska and Canada, the western and southern coasts of Greenland, and northern Scandinavia and Russia. The snow bunting winters throughout southern Canada and the northern United States in North America, and its Eurasian range includes the northern United Kingdom and a large band extending from Germany west through Poland and Ukraine to Mongolia and China. Additionally, the snow bunting has been recorded as a vagrant to Algeria and Morocco in North Africa, the Balkans, Greece and Turkey, and Malta. The Lapland longspur's range is similar to that of the snow bunting, breeding in northern Canada, Scandinavia, and Siberia, and coastal Alaska and Greenland and wintering in the northern United States and Canada, and in a band between approximately 45° and 55° latitude across Russia, Kazakhstan, China, and Mongolia to the Sea of Japan.

The ranges of the other species in the family are less expansive than those of the snow bunting and the Lapland longspur. McKay's bunting breeds solely on several islands in the Bering Sea, and winters primarily on the western coast of Alaska. Additionally, it has been reported occasionally in the Aleutian Islands, and has been a vagrant in British Columbia in Canada as well as Washington (state) and Oregon in the United States. Smith's longspur breeds in Alaska and northern Canada, and winters in the central southern United States. The chestnut-collared longspur's breeding range consists solely of prairie regions in the northern Great Plains and southern Canadian Prairies, while its winter range extends from the southern United States to central Mexico. The breeding range of the thick-billed longspur is similar to that of the chestnut-collared longspur, but its winter range does not extend as far south, ending in northern Mexico.

Members of Calcariidae generally inhabit open areas, including prairies, plains, shores, farmland, and beaches. Parts of the snow bunting's range include mountainous areas.

== Behavior ==
The diet of species in this family consists of insects, seeds, and grasses. Species are diurnal, and forage by walking and picking up food from the ground.
