= David Lewis Phares =

American physician, scientist and educator (1817–1892)

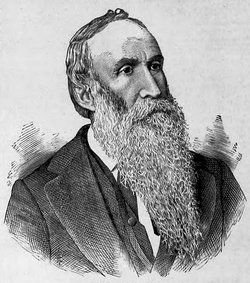
- David Lewis Phares (1817 – 1892)
- Born: David Lewis Phares; January 14, 1817; West Feliciana Parish, Louisiana, US
- Died: September 19, 1892 (aged 75); Madison Station, Mississippi, US
- Resting place: Montgomery Cemetery in Madison, Mississippi
- Education: College of Louisiana at Jackson (1837); Medical College of Louisiana (1839); University of Kentucky (1840)
- Occupations: Physician, scientist, educator and minister
- Spouse(s): Mary Armstrong Nesmith (m. 1836); Laura Blanche Duquercron (m. 1881)
- Children: 10

David Lewis Phares (January 14, 1817 – September 19, 1892) was an American physician, scientist, educator and minister. He is credited with having established two colleges, served as a medical physician for 40 years, and served as a college department head and professor.

== Biography ==
Phares was born January 14, 1817 in West Feliciana Parish, Louisiana as the youngest child of William Phares and Elizabeth Starnes Phares. As a teenager, Phares developed keen interests in surveying by inventing a sextant and in the study of solar events (i.e., solar spots and eclipses), the latter of which resulted in transient blindness.

In 1832, Phares entered the College of Louisiana at Jackson and graduated in 1837, attaining the first bachelor of arts degree to be conferred in Louisiana. During this period, Phares began following the teachings of evangelist Alexander Campbell and his Restoration Movement. As a result, Phares became a minister in the movement and eventually organized Campbellite churches near his home in Wilkinson County, Mississippi.

Phares continued his education in pursuit of a medical degree by enrolling in the Medical College of Louisiana in New Orleans and graduated in 1839. In 1840, he received a Master of Arts degree from the University of Kentucky. Afterwards, Phares relocated to the community of Whitestown (aka Newtonia), Mississippi at 31.0405°N 91.2059°W, in Wilkinson County where he served as a physician.

A proponent of education, Phares established two institutions of higher learning – Newton Female Institute (1842) and Newton College for male students (1852) – near his home in Wilkinson County. Both institutions thrived until the outbreak of the American Civil War, but they were closed by 1865.

Phares did not serve in the military during the American Civil War, but as a physician, he provided care for the sick and wounded soldiers. Because of the war, he was unable to obtain traditional medications for his patients. Consequently, he became versed in the medicinal benefits of local plants and eventually published articles on the medicinal qualities of these native species. At the request of the Mississippi Legislature, in 1878, Phares published Synopsis of Medical Flora of Mississippi which reported on the therapeutic uses of 700 plant species indigenous to Mississippi.

In 1867, a National Grange was founded in the United States as a social network for farming communities to promote their economic and political agricultural interests. In Mississippi, D. L. Phares was one of the promoters and founders of the Mississippi Grange which was chartered in April 1872. An important objective of the Mississippi Grange was to establish a state agricultural and mechanical college, and Phares was instrumental in the founding of the Mississippi Agricultural and Mechanical College in 1878. As a result of Phares' efforts, Mississippi Governor John Stone appointed him as a member of the institution's board of trustees. In 1880, Phares was appointed to the A&M college faculty as "chair of horticulture, botany, and animal and vegetable physiology" and also became the college physician.

In 1881, Phares published the Farmer's book of grasses and other forage plants, for the southern United States. The book was reported to be the first publication by a faculty member from Mississippi's A&M College. Phares became widely recognized as an authority on agriculture through his interactions with farmers and the numerous articles he wrote for agricultural, veterinary, and medical publications.

Phares served as a member of the first Mississippi State Board of Health which was established in 1877.

In honor of his significant contributions to the state, Phares was inducted into the Mississippi Hall of Fame.

== Personal life ==
In 1836, Phares married Mary Armstrong Nesmith from Amite County, Mississippi, and they became the parents of eight children – three sons and five daughters.

Following the death of his first wife in 1876, Phares married Laura Blanche Duquercron from Starkville, Mississippi in 1881. They were the parents of two sons, but both died in infancy.

Phares retired from Mississippi's Agricultural and Mechanical College in 1889 and moved to Madison Station, Mississippi. In his later years, Phares was stricken by a number of strokes and died on September 19, 1892. He was buried at Montgomery Cemetery in Madison, Mississippi.
