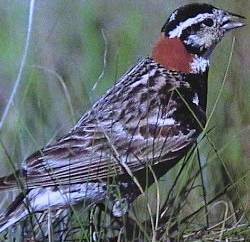
- Chestnut-collared longspur (Calcarius ornatus)

Scientific classification
- Kingdom: Animalia
- Phylum: Chordata
- Class: Aves
- Order: Passeriformes
- Family: Calcariidae
- Genus: Calcarius; Bechstein, 1802

Type species
- Fringilla lapponica Linnaeus, 1758

= Longspur =

Longspurs

Genus of birds

The longspurs, genus Calcarius, are a group of birds in the family Calcariidae. The name refers to the long claw on the hind toe of each foot. The genus formerly included the thick-billed longspur, Rhyncophanes mccownii, which is now placed in a separate genus.

== Taxonomy ==
The genus Calcarius was introduced in 1802 by the German naturalist Johann Matthäus Bechstein to accommodate a single species, Fringilla lapponica Linnaeus 1758, which therefore becomes the type species by monotypy. The genus name is from Latin calcaria meaning "spurs".

These are chunky ground-feeding birds with long wings which are usually seen in open areas. Males declare ownership of a territory by singing during short flights over it. The male's breeding plumage is much brighter than his winter plumage. These birds gather in large flocks in winter. The longspurs are all found in North America; the Lapland longspur, or Lapland bunting, is also found in Europe and Asia.

== Species ==
The genus contains the following three species:

Genus Calcarius – Bechstein, 1802 – 3 species
Common name	Scientific name and subspecies	Range	Size and ecology	IUCN status and estimated population
Lapland longspur	Calcarius lapponicus (Linnaeus, 1758) Five subspecies: C. l. subcalcaratus (Brehm, CL, 1826): north Canada and Greenland; C. l. lapponicus (Linnaeus, 1758): north Europe and north Asia; C. l. kamtschaticus (Portenko, 1937): northeast Siberia; C. l. alascensis (Ridgway, 1898): extreme east Siberia, Alaska and northwest Canada; C. l. coloratus (Ridgway, 1898): Commander Islands	Breeds across Arctic Europe and the Palearctic and in Canada and the northernmost United States; winters in the Russian steppes, the southern United States, northern Scandinavia and south to coastal southern Sweden, Denmark and Great Britain; Range Breeding Migration Nonbreeding	Size: 15–16 cm (5.9–6.3 in) Habitat: Wet tundra, riparian areas and marshes; nests on the ground on heavily vegetated slopes or among tussocks in low-lying wet areas; in winter, agricultural fields Diet: Seeds in winter, picked from the ground (grass, foxtail, millet, crabgrass, wheat); arthropods in summer, often caught in mid-air	LC
Smith's longspur	Calcarius pictus (Swainson, 1832)	Breeds in northern Canada and Alaska; winters in the south-central United States Breeding Migration Nonbreeding	Size: 15–17 cm (5.9–6.7 in) Habitat: Open grassy areas near the tree line; in winter, open fields including airports Diet: Forages on the ground; mainly seeds, but preferentially insects and spiders in summer	LC
Chestnut-collared longspur	Calcarius ornatus (Townsend, 1837)	Breeds in central Canada and the north-central United States; winters in the southern United States and Mexico Breeding Migration Nonbreeding	Size: 13–16.5 cm (5.1–6.5 in) Habitat: Short and mixed grass prairies, preferring grass under 1 ft (30 cm) and land shaped by grazing or controlled burns; livestock pastures and mowed airstrips; in winter, shortgrass prairies and desert grasslands Diet: Forages on the ground; mainly seeds, with insects (grasshoppers, beetles, ants) in summer	VU Decreasing; 73–87% decline since the 1960s
