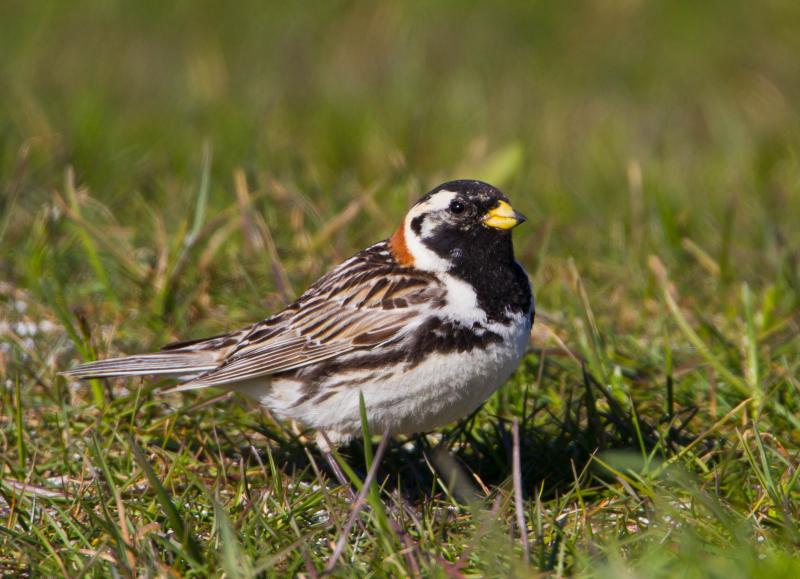
- Male

Conservation status
- Least Concern (IUCN 3.1)

Scientific classification
- Kingdom: Animalia
- Phylum: Chordata
- Class: Aves
- Order: Passeriformes
- Family: Calcariidae
- Genus: Calcarius
- Species: C. lapponicus

Binomial name
- Calcarius lapponicus (Linnaeus, 1758)
- Range Breeding Migration Nonbreeding

Synonyms
- Fringilla lapponica Linnaeus, 1758

= Lapland longspur =

Species of passerine bird in the longspur family Calcariidae

Calcarius lapponicus

The Lapland longspur (Calcarius lapponicus), also known as the Lapland bunting, is a passerine bird in the longspur family Calcariidae. It is a circumpolar arctic breeder and the only member of the genus Calcarius present in Eurasia.

== Taxonomy ==
The Lapland longspur was formally described in 1758 by the Swedish naturalist Carl Linnaeus in the tenth edition of his Systema Naturae. He placed it with the finches in the genus Fringilla and coined the binomial name Fringilla lapponica. The family is now generally separated by modern authors from the Fringillidae (Old World finches). The Lapland longspur is now one of three longspurs placed in the genus Calcarius that was introduced in 1802 by the German naturalist Johann Matthäus Bechstein. The English name refers to the long hind claws. The genus name Calcarius is from Latin calcaria, "spurs", and the specific lapponicus refers to Lapland.

Five subspecies are recognised:

- C. l. subcalcaratus (Brehm, CL, 1826) – north Canada and Greenland
- C. l. lapponicus (Linnaeus, 1758) – north Europe and north Asia
- C. l. kamtschaticus Portenko, 1937 – northeast Siberia
- C. l. alascensis Ridgway, 1898 – extreme east Siberia, Alaska and northwest Canada
- C. l. coloratus Ridgway, 1898 – Commander Islands

== Description ==
The Lapland longspur is a robust bird, with a thick yellow seed-eater's bill. The summer male has a black head and throat, white eyestripe, chestnut nape, white underparts, and a heavily streaked black-grey back. Other plumages have a plainer orange-brown head, a browner back and chestnut nape and wing panels.

Measurements:

- Length: 5.9–6.3 in (15–16 cm)
- Weight: 0.8–1.2 oz (22.3–33.1 g)
- Wingspan: 8.7–11.4 in (22–29 cm)

== Distribution and habitat ==
It breeds across Arctic Europe and the Palearctic and in Canada and the northernmost United States. It is migratory, wintering in the Russian steppes, the southern United States, Northern Scandinavian arctic areas and down to coastal Southern Sweden, Denmark and Great Britain. This is the only Asian species of the longspur buntings, and while it probably did not evolve there, it has been present in Eastern Europe for at least about 30,000 years.

== Behaviour ==
=== Call ===
The most common flight call is a hard "prrrrt" usually preceded by a more nasal "teeww". When breeding, it also makes a softer "duyyeee" followed by a pause and a "triiiuuu"; both sounds alternate.

=== Breeding ===
The Lapland longspur is a ground-nesting bird, preferring to build its cup nest on heavily-vegetated slopes or among tussocks in low-lying wet areas. They lay, on average, 5 eggs per brood. It breeds in wet tundra, riparian areas, and marshes.

=== Wintering ===
During the winter, these birds are commonly found across the Great Plains and northeast of the United States, as well as southern Canada, where they can typically be seen foraging in agricultural fields. Lapland longspurs often form mixed-species flocks in winter, where they are regularly accompanied by horned larks and snow buntings.

=== Hybridization ===
In 2011, a male Lapland longspur × snow bunting hybrid was identified in Newfoundland and Labrador, Canada.

=== Food habits ===
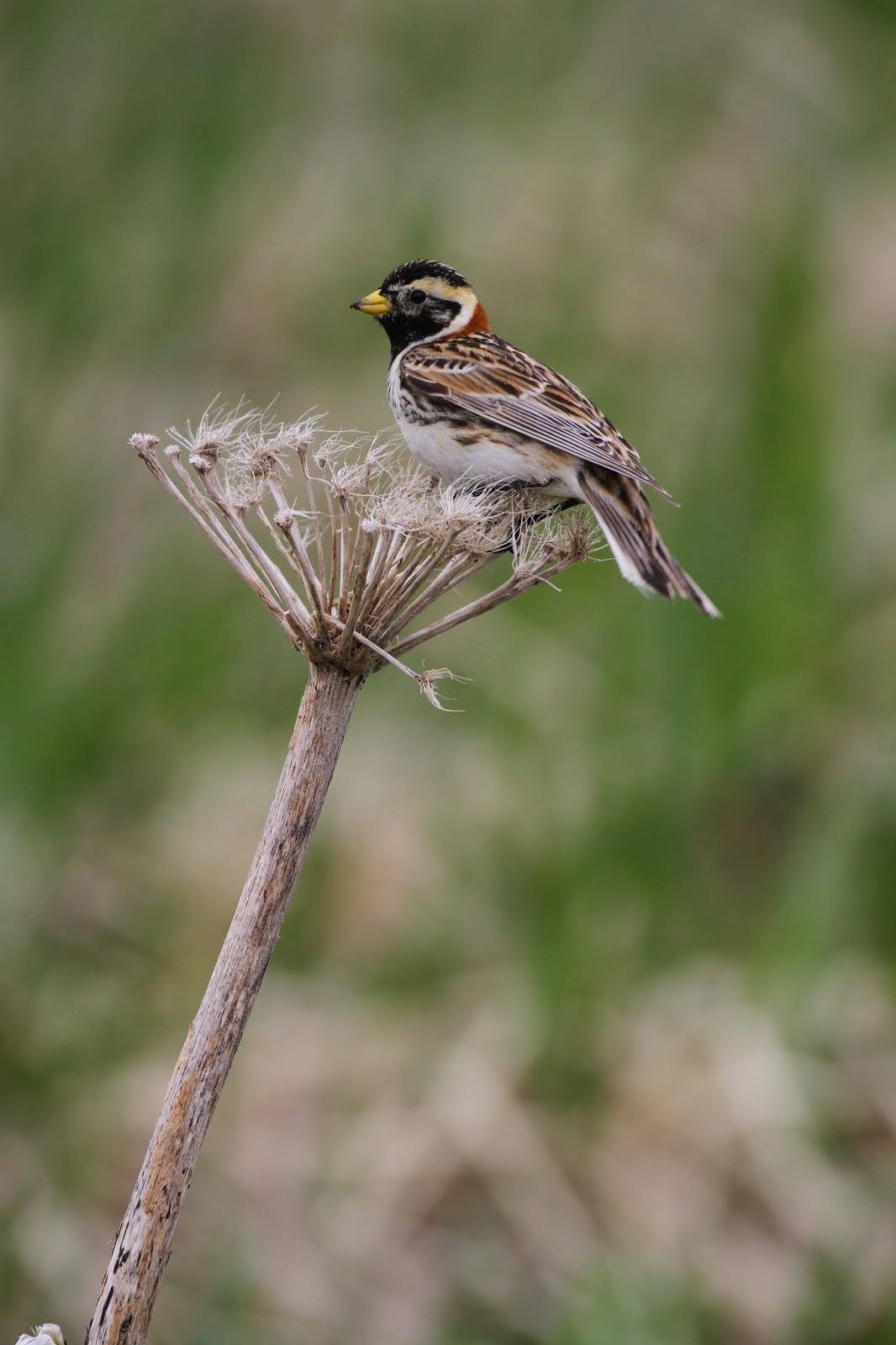
Sitting on a dead cow parsnip, Buldir Island, Alaska

The food habits of the Lapland longspur are quite simple: mostly seeds in winter and arthropods in the summer, when they are in activity.

During the winter, the longspur feeds on seeds. They pick them on the ground, rarely feeding directly on plants. They will forage around the same area for a period varying between a few minutes and an hour, then fly away looking for a new foraging area. Their seed diet is composed mainly of seeds from grass, foxtail, cultivated millet, crabgrass and wheat. During the breeding season, the birds migrate to the north, where their diet switches to arthropods. Nestlings are only fed arthropods, which also constitute the diet of the parents at that time of the year (June to July). The birds often catch insects in mid-air, but do forage through vegetation when climatic conditions prevent the insects from flying. Longspurs can consume between 3000 and 10,000 prey items (insects or seeds) per day, depending on their energy needs; they may need to increase this number by 3000 when feeding the young. Dipteran larvae and adults form the major part of their insectivorous diet.

== Gallery ==
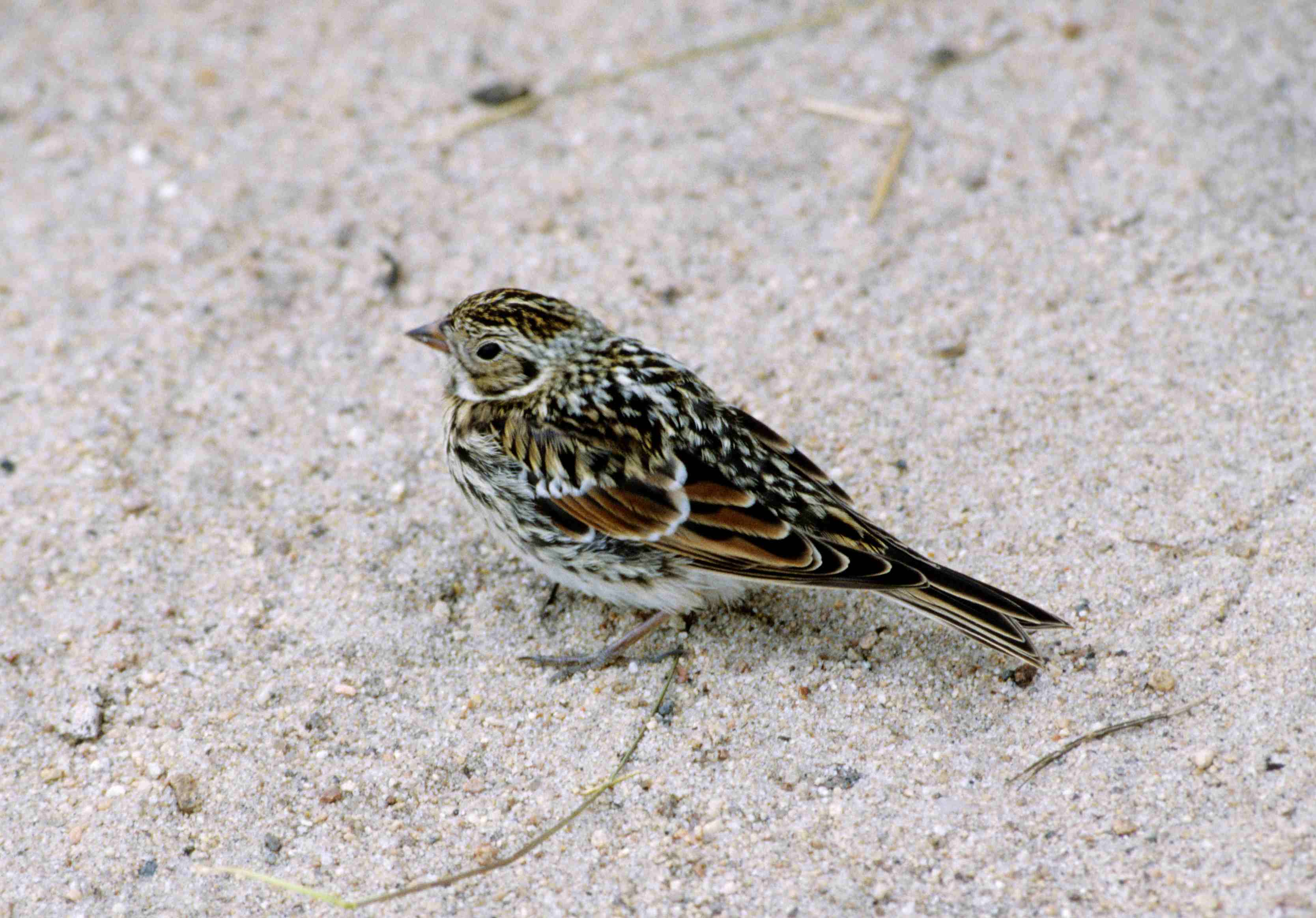
Female

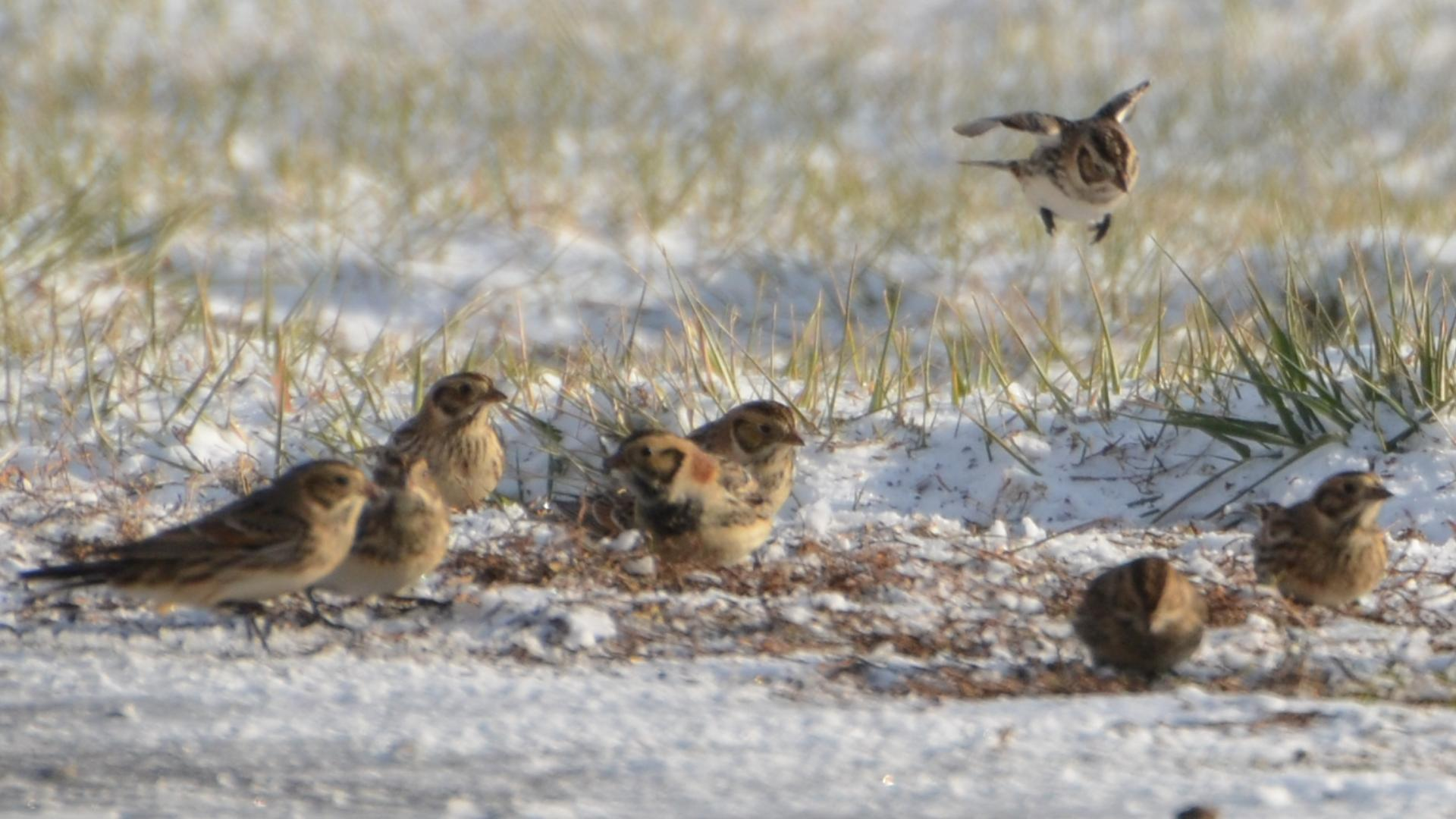
Flock

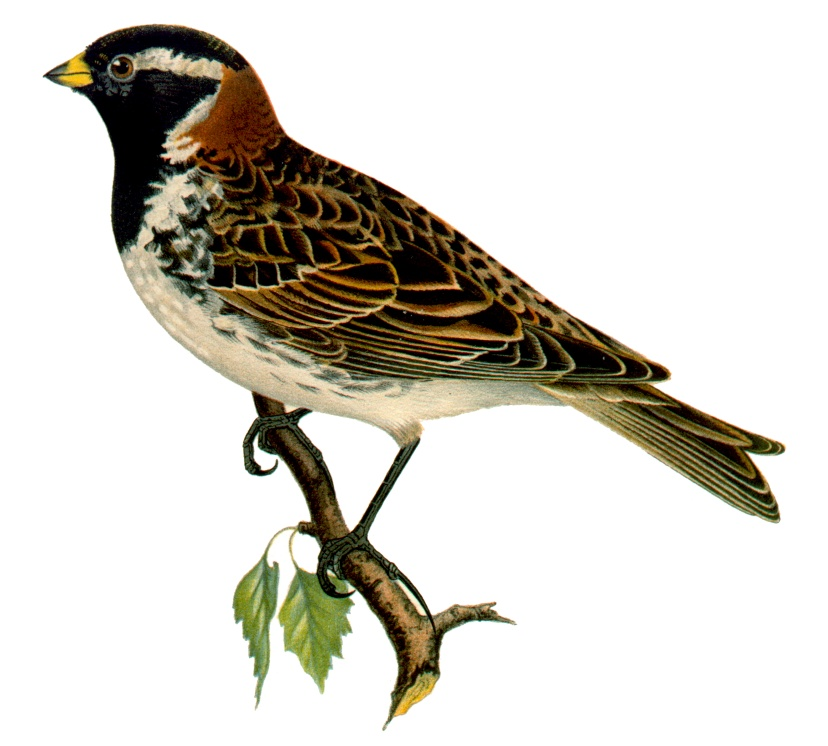
Illustration

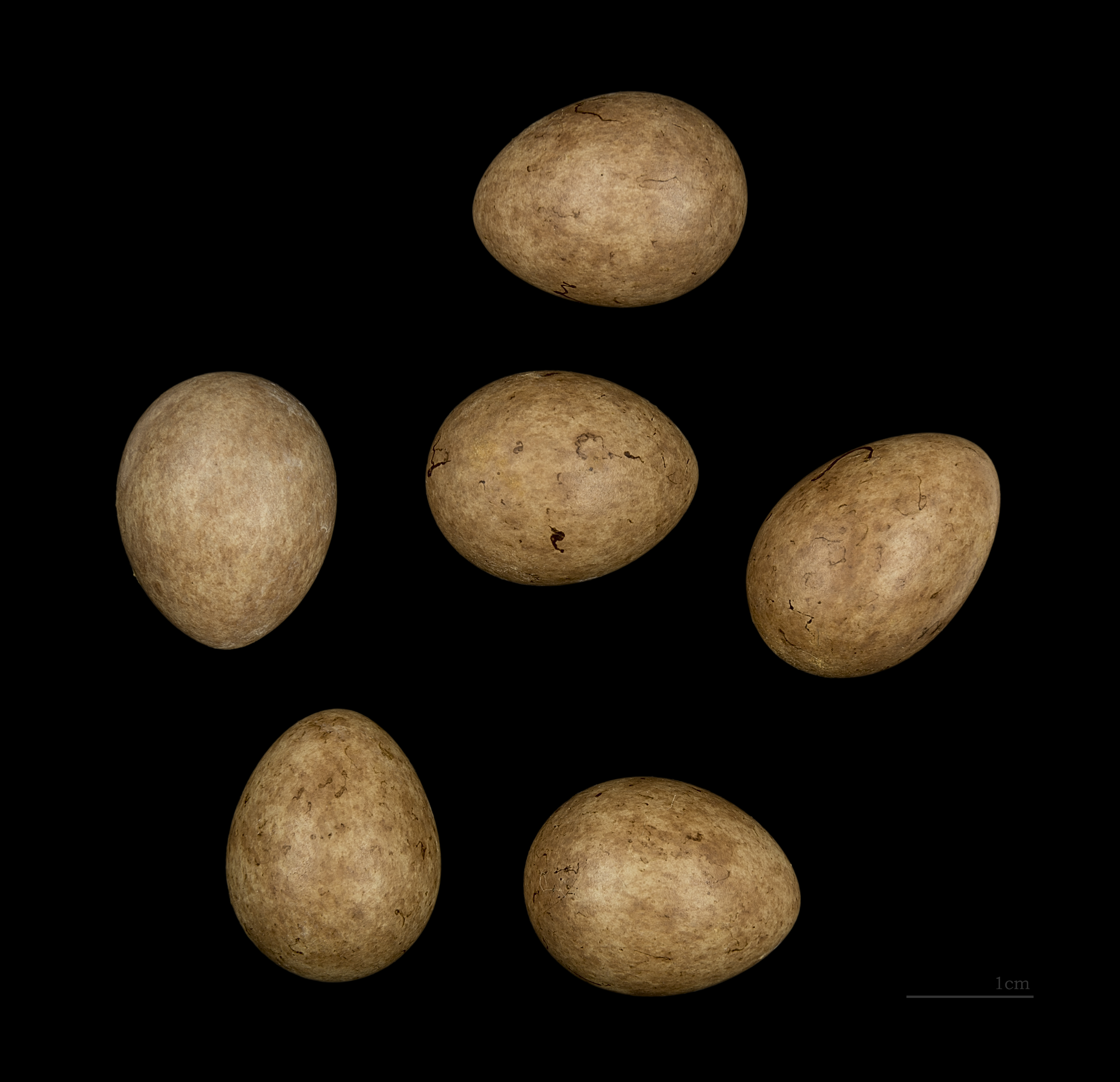
Eggs
