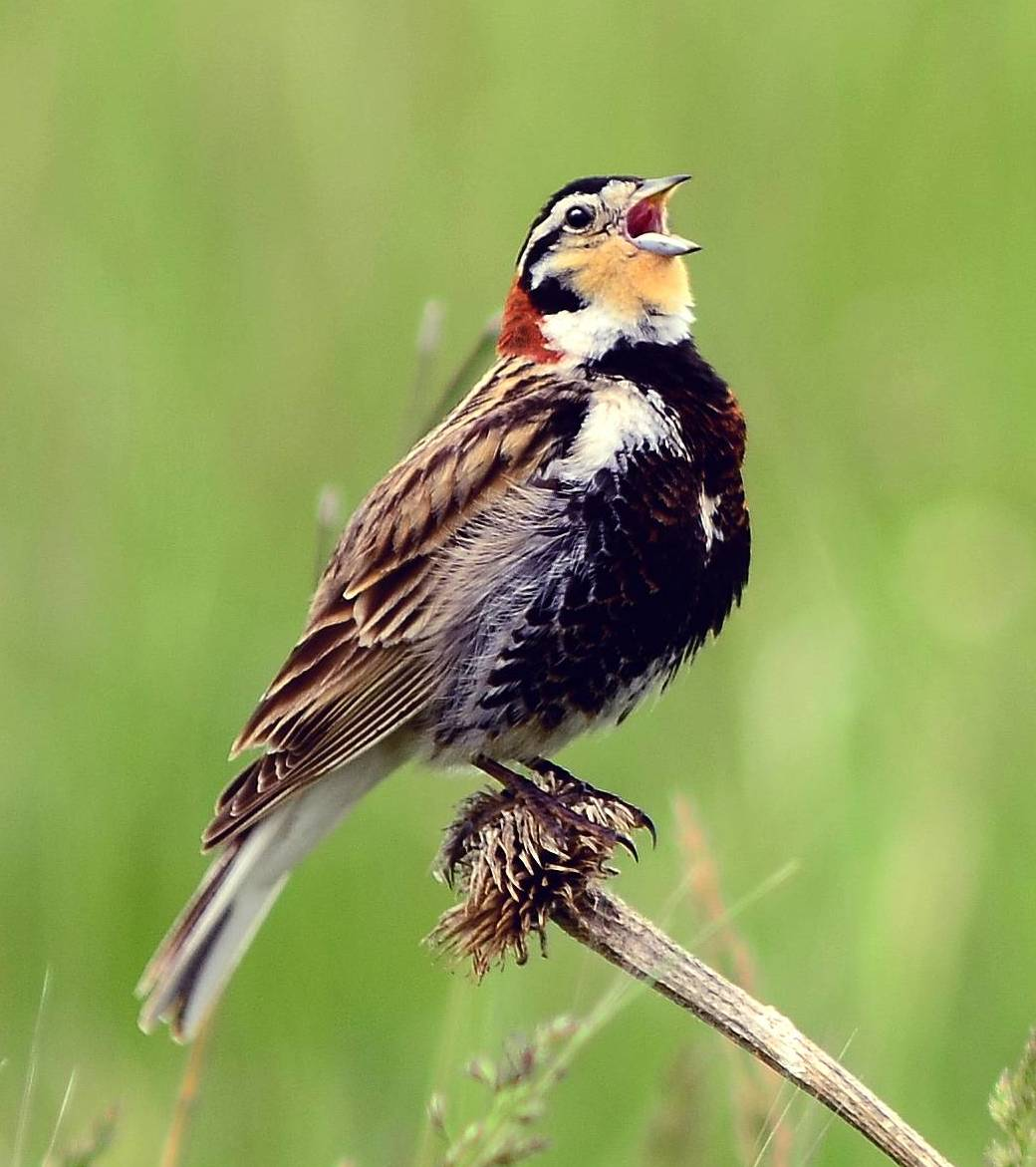

Conservation status
- Vulnerable (IUCN 3.1)

Scientific classification
- Kingdom: Animalia
- Phylum: Chordata
- Class: Aves
- Order: Passeriformes
- Family: Calcariidae
- Genus: Calcarius
- Species: C. ornatus

Binomial name
- Calcarius ornatus (Townsend, 1837)

= Chestnut-collared longspur =

Species of bird

The chestnut-collared longspur (Calcarius ornatus) is a species of bird in the family Calcariidae. Like the other longspurs, it is a small ground-feeding bird that primarily eats seeds. It breeds in prairie habitats in Canada and the northern United States and winters to the south in the United States and Mexico.

== Description ==
These birds have a short conical bill, a streaked back and a white tail with a dark tip. However, the species displays clear sexual dimorphism during the breeding season. In breeding plumage, the male has black underparts, a chestnut nape, a yellow throat and a black crown. Meanwhile, females and non-breeding adult birds have light brown underparts, a dark crown, brown wings and a more subtle, “buff-colored face pattern.”

Measurements:

- Length: 5.1–6.5 in (13–16.5 cm)
- Weight: 0.6–0.8 oz (17–23 g)
- Wingspan: 25–27 cm
- Egg dimensions: 0.6–0.8 in (1.6-2.1 cm) in length, 0.5–0.6 in (1.3-1.6 cm) in width

== Taxonomy and systematics ==
Calcarius ornatus, belonging to the family Calcariidae, is a migratory obligate grassland songbird that was first formally described by American naturalist John Kirk Townsend in 1837.

== Etymology ==
Calcarius derives from the Latin word calcar, meaning “spur.” It describes the “elongated claw of the hind toe.” Similarly, “longspur” also highlights the characteristic of a long hind claw found on each of the bird’s feet. Ornatus, meaning “adorned” or “decorated” in Latin, describes the male’s specific coloration across its body.

== Distribution and habitat ==
This bird breeds in short and mixed grass prairies in central Canada and the north central United States. They prefer areas where grass height is under 1 foot and frequently inhabit land shaped by grazing or controlled burns. Historically, this habitat was maintained by bison, but today longspurs also rely on livestock pastures and mowed airstrips. In winter, they migrate in flocks to prairies and open fields in the southern United States and Mexico, inhabiting shortgrass prairies and desert grasslands with little to no shrub stock or cover.

== Behavior ==
=== Diet and foraging ===
These birds forage on the ground, gathering in flocks in winter. While wintering flocks are gregarious and can number between 50 and 100 individuals, breeding pairs actively defend their territories from other pairs.

Their diet consists primarily of seeds, also eating insects (such as grasshoppers, beetles, and ants) in summer. Young birds are mainly fed insects.

=== Breeding and reproduction ===
The female lays 4 or 5 eggs in a grass cup nest in a shallow scrape on the ground. Both parents feed the young birds.

The call is a two-syllabled chee dee.

=== Vocalizations ===
The male sings and flies up to defend his territory. The call of the chestnut-collared longspur is a distinctive two-syllabled note, and males deliver a complex, melodious, descending warbling song during their territorial flight displays.

== Conservation and status ==
=== Population decline ===
The chestnut-collared longspur is designated as a "Red Alert Tipping Point" species by the State of the Birds report and is listed as Vulnerable on the IUCN Red List. Driven by severe habitat loss, the species has suffered a steep long-term population decline of over 73% to 87% since the 1960s.

=== Threats ===
The primary driver of their decline is the conversion of native shortgrass and mixed-grass prairies into agricultural croplands and towns. Additionally, natural high rates of nest predation and prolonged rainstorms or severe weather events also impact population productivity.

=== Conservation management ===
Controlled burns may benefit this species as they feed on low-growing plants that are more easily spotted after a fire.
