= Leonid Portenko =

Soviet ornithologist

Leonid Oleksandrovych Portenko Леонід Олександрович Портенко
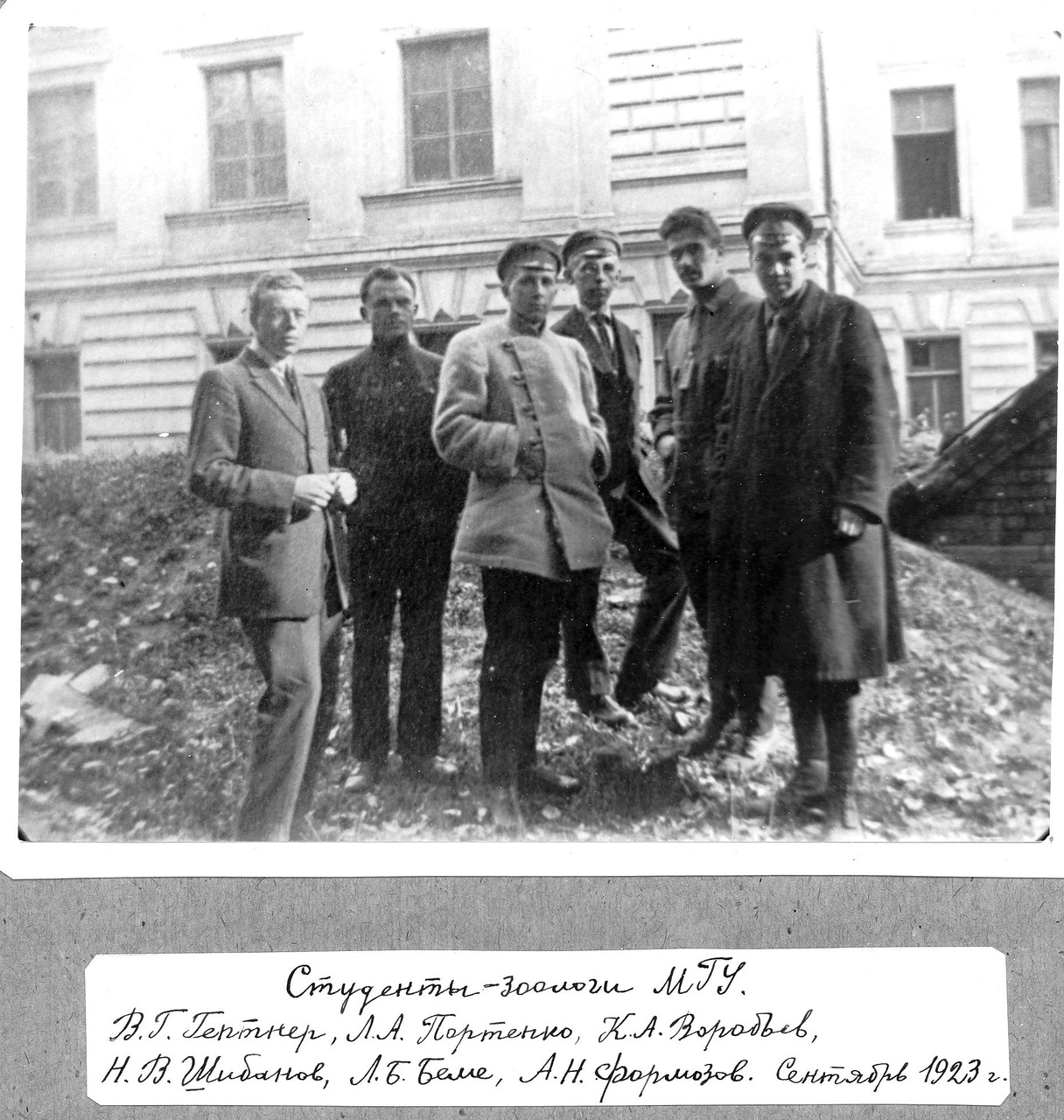
- Portenko (second from left) with fellow students in 1923
- Born: 11 October 1896; Smila, Ukraine
- Died: 26 May 1972 (aged 75); Leningrad
- Known for: Studies of the birds of the northern and north-eastern Palearctic realm
- Scientific career
- Fields: Ornithology
- Workplaces: Academy of Sciences of the Soviet Union, Leningrad

Leonid Oleksandrovych Portenko (Ukrainian: Леонід Олександрович Портенко; 11 October 1896 – 26 May 1972) was a Soviet ornithologist of Ukrainian origin who carried out extensive zoogeographic studies on the birds of the northern and north-eastern Palearctic realm. He was born in Smila, though most of his career was spent working in, and conducting expeditions from, the ornithological department of the Zoological Institute of the Academy of Sciences of the Soviet Union in Leningrad.

His publications include:

- 1939, 1941 – Fauna of the Anadyr area
- 1954, 1960 – The birds of the USSR
- 1972–1973 – The birds of the Chukchi Peninsula and Wrangel Island
- 1973 – Fauna of birds of non-polar parts of the Northern Urals
- 1975 – The birds of zonal steppes and deserts of Central Asia
