= List of birds of the Aleutian Islands =

The avifauna of the Aleutian Islands included 376 species according to Gibson and Byrd (2007), Bird Checklists of the World (Avibase), and the American Ornithological Society (AOS) as of March 2021.

Of them, 44 (12%) are year-round residents and breeders, 26 (7%) migrate to the Aleutians to breed, 18 (5%) migrate to the Aleutians to winter, 6 (2%) are non-breeding summer residents, 37 (10%) are annual through-migrants, 196 (53%) are vagrants of less-than-annual occurrence. The status of the remaining 42 is not noted by either Gibson and Byrd or Avibase. Several of the vagrants have only a single record.

This list is presented in the taxonomic sequence of the Check-list of North and Middle American Birds, 7th edition through the 62nd Supplement, published by the AOS. Common and scientific names are also those of the Check-list, except that the common names of families are from the Clements taxonomy because the AOS list does not include them.

The following terms are used to denote the annual and seasonal status of each species reported by Gibson and Byrd (2007), or in the case of "Accidental", noted as such for species added from Avibase:

- Accidental – one or two records
- Casual – recorded in less than 30% of years in the appropriate season, but in at least three calendar years
- Intermittent – recorded in 30% or more years in the appropriate season, but not annually
- Migrant – annual through-migrant in spring or fall
- Resident – substantial numbers present throughout the year
- Summer – migrates to the Aleutians to breed or to summer offshore
- Winter – migrates to the Aleutians to winter
- Annual breeders are designated with an asterisk (*), as in resident* or summer*.

== Ducks, geese, and waterfowl ==
Order: Anseriformes Family: Anatidae

- Emperor goose, Anser canagica (winter)
- Snow goose, Anser caerulescens (casual)
- Ross's goose, Anser rossii (accidental)
- Greater white-fronted goose, Anser albifrons (migrant)
- Lesser white-fronted goose, Anser erythropus (accidental)
- Taiga bean-goose, Anser fabalis (intermittent)
- Tundra bean-goose, Anser serrirostris
- Brant, Branta bernicla (migrant)
- Cackling goose, Branta hutchinsii (summer*)
- Canada goose, Branta canadensis (accidental)
- Trumpeter swan, Cygnus buccinator
- Tundra swan, Cygnus columbianus (resident*)
- Whooper swan, Cygnus cygnus (winter)
- Baikal teal, Sibirionetta formosa (casual)
- Garganey, Spatula querquendula (intermittent)
- Blue-winged teal, Spatula discors (accidental)
- Northern shoveler, Spatula clypeata (migrant)
- Gadwall, Mareca strepera (winter)
- Falcated duck, Mareca falcata (intermittent)
- Eurasian wigeon, Mareca penelope (migrant)
- American wigeon, Mareca americana (intermittent)
- Eastern spot-billed duck, Anas zonorhyncha (casual)
- Mallard, Anas platyrhynchos (resident*)
- Northern pintail, Anas acuta (resident*)
- Green-winged teal, Anas crecca (resident*)
- Canvasback, Aythya valisneria (casual or intermittent)
- Redhead, Aythya americana (accidental)
- Common pochard, Aythya ferina (intermittent)
- Ring-necked duck, Aythya collaris (casual)
- Tufted duck, Aythya fuligula (migrant)
- Greater scaup, Aythya marila (resident*)
- Lesser scaup, Aythya affinis (casual or intermittent)
- Steller's eider, Polysticta stelleri (winter)
- Spectacled eider, Somateria fischeri (accidental)
- King eider, Somateria spectabilis (winter)
- Common eider, Somateria mollissima (resident*)
- Harlequin duck, Histrionicus histrionicus (resident)
- Surf scoter, Melanitta perspicillata (casual or intermittent)
- White-winged scoter, Melanitta deglandi (winter)
- Stejneger's Scoter, Melanitta stejnegeri
- Black scoter, Melanitta amerivcana (winter)
- Long-tailed duck, Clangula hyemalis (winter)
- Bufflehead, Bucephala albeola (winter)
- Common goldeneye, Bucephala clangula (winter)
- Barrow's goldeneye, Bucephala islandica (winter)
- Smew, Mergellus albellus (winter)
- Hooded merganser, Lophodytes cucullatus (casual)
- Common merganser, Mergus merganser (resident)
- Red-breasted merganser, Mergus serrator (resident*)

== Pheasants, grouse, and allies ==
Order: Galliformes Family: Phasianidae

- Willow ptarmigan, Lagopus lagopus (resident*)
- Rock ptarmigan, Lagopus mutus (resident*)

== Grebes ==
Order: Podicipediformes Family: Podicipedidae

- Horned grebe, Podiceps auritus (winter)
- Red-necked grebe, Podiceps grisegena (winter)
- Western grebe, Aechmophorus occidentalis

== Pigeons and doves ==
Order: Columbiformes Family: Columbidae

- Rock pigeon, Columba livia (I) (accidental)
- Oriental turtle-dove, Streptopelia orientlalis (casual or accidental)

== Cuckoos ==
Order: Cuculiformes Family: Cuculidae

- Common cuckoo, Cuculus canorus (intermittent)
- Oriental cuckoo, Cuculus optatus (casual)

== Nightjars ==
Order: Caprimulgiformes Family: Caprimulgidae

- Gray nightjar, Caprimulgus jotaka (accidental)

== Swifts ==
Order: Apodiformes Family: Apodidae

- Chimney swift, Chaetura pelagica (accidental)
- White-throated needletail, Hirundapus caudacutus (casual)
- Common swift, Apus apus (accidental)
- Fork-tailed swift, Apus pacificus (casual)

== Hummingbirds ==
Order: Apodiformes Family: Trochilidae

- Rufous hummingbird, Selasphorus rufus (accidental)

== Rails, gallinules, and coots ==
Order: Gruiformes Family: Rallidae

- Sora, Porzana carolina (accidental)
- Common moorhen, Gallinula chloropus (accidental)
- Eurasian Coot, Fulica atra (accidental)
- American coot, Fulica americana (accidental)

== Cranes ==
Order: Gruiformes Family: Gruidae

- Sandhill crane, Antigone canadensis (summer*)

== Stilts and avocets ==
Order: Charadriiformes Family: Recurvirostridae

- Black-winged stilt, Himantopus himantopus (casual or accidental)

== Oystercatchers ==
Order: Charadriiformes Family: Haematopodidae

- Eurasian oystercatcher, Haematopus ostralegus (accidental)
- Black oystercatcher, Haematopus bachmani (resident*)

== Plovers and lapwings ==
Order: Charadriiformes Family: Charadriidae

- Northern lapwing, Vanellus vanellus (accidental)
- Black-bellied plover, Pluvialis squatarola (migrant)
- European golden-plover, Pluvialis apricaria (accidental)
- American golden-plover, Pluvialis dominica (accidental)
- Pacific golden-plover, Pluvialis fulva (migrant)
- Eurasian dotterel, Charadrius morinellus (casual)
- Killdeer, Charadrius vociferus (accidental)
- Common ringed plover, Charadrius hiaticula (casual)
- Semipalmated plover, Charadrius semipalmatus (summer*)
- Little ringed plover, Charadrius dubius (casual)
- Lesser sand-plover, Charadrius mongolus (migrant)

== Sandpipers and allies ==
Order: Charadriiformes Family: Scolopacidae

- Upland sandpiper, Bartramia longicauda (accidental)
- Bristle-thighed curlew, Numenius tahitiensis (intermittent)
- Whimbrel, Numenius phaeopus (migrant)
- Eskimo curlew, Numenius borealis (accidental, possibly extinct)
- Far Eastern curlew, Numenius madagascariensis (intermittent)
- Bar-tailed godwit, Limosa lapponica (migrant)
- Black-tailed godwit, Limosa limosa (intermittent)
- Hudsonian godwit, Limosa haemastica (accidental)
- Marbled godwit, Limosa fedoa
- Ruddy turnstone, Arenaria interpres (migrant)
- Black turnstone, Arenaria melanocephala
- Great knot, Calidris tenuirostris (casual)
- Red knot, Calidris canutus (casual)
- Surfbird, Calidris virgata
- Ruff, Calidris pugnax (migrant)
- Broad-billed sandpiper, Calidris falcinellus (casual)
- Sharp-tailed sandpiper, Calidris acuminata (migrant)
- Stilt sandpiper, Calidris himantopus (accidental)
- Curlew sandpiper, Calidris ferruginea (casual)
- Temminck's stint, Calidris temminckii (intermittent)
- Long-toed stint, Calidris subminuta (migrant)
- Spoon-billed sandpiper, Calidris pygmeus (casual or accidental)
- Red-necked stint, Calidris ruficollis (intermittent)
- Sanderling, Calidris alba (winter)
- Dunlin, Calidris alpina (migrant)
- Rock sandpiper, Calidris ptilocnemis (resident*)
- Baird's sandpiper, Calidris bairdii (intermittent)
- Little stint, Calidris minuta (casual)
- Least sandpiper, Calidris minutilla (summer*)
- White-rumped sandpiper, Calidris fuscicollis (accidental)
- Buff-breasted sandpiper, Calidris subruficollis (casual)
- Pectoral sandpiper, Calidris melanotos (migrant)
- Semipalmated sandpiper, Calidris pusilla (casual)
- Western sandpiper, Calidris mauri (intermittent)
- Short-billed dowitcher, Limnodromus griseus (casual)
- Long-billed dowitcher, Limnodromus scolopaceus (migrant)
- Jack snipe, Lymnocryptes minimus (accidental)
- Solitary snipe, Gallinago solitaria (accidental)
- Pin-tailed snipe, Gallinago stenura (casual or accidental)
- Common snipe, Gallinago gallinago (migrant)
- Wilson's snipe, Gallinago delicata (summer*)
- Terek sandpiper, Xenus cinereus (casual or intermittent)
- Common sandpiper, Actitis hypoleucos (migrant)
- Spotted sandpiper, Actitis macularia (accidental)
- Green sandpiper, Tringa ochropus (casual)
- Solitary sandpiper, Tringa solitaria (accidental)
- Gray-tailed tattler, Tringa brevipes (migrant)
- Wandering tattler, Tringa incana (migrant)
- Lesser yellowlegs, Tringa flavipes (casual)
- Spotted redshank, Tringa erythropus (casual)
- Common greenshank, Tringa nebularia (migrant)
- Greater yellowlegs, Tringa melanoleuca (casual)
- Wood sandpiper, Tringa glareola (migrant)
- Marsh sandpiper, Tringa stagnatilis (casual)
- Wilson's phalarope, Phalaropus tricolor (accidental)
- Red-necked phalarope, Phalaropus lobatus (summer*)
- Red phalarope, Phalaropus fulicarius (migrant)

== Pratincoles and coursers ==
Order: Charadriiformes Family: Glareolidae

- Oriental pratincole, Glareola maldivarum (accidental)

== Skuas and jaegers ==
Order: Charadriiformes Family: Stercorariidae

- South polar skua, Stercorarius maccormicki (casual)
- Pomarine jaeger, Stercorarius pomarinus (migrant)
- Parasitic jaeger, Stercorarius parasiticus (summer*)
- Long-tailed jaeger, Stercorarius longicaudus (migrant)

== Auks, murres, and puffins ==
Order: Charadriiformes Family: Alcidae

- Dovekie, Alle alle (casual)
- Common murre, Uria aalge (resident*)
- Thick-billed murre, Uria lomvia (resident*)
- Black guillemot, Cepphus grylle
- Pigeon guillemot, Cepphus columba (resident*)
- Long-billed murrelet, Brachyramphus perdix (accidental)
- Marbled murrelet, Brachyramphus marmoratus (resident*)
- Kittlitz's murrelet, Brachyramphus brevirostris (summer*)
- Ancient murrelet, Synthliboramphus antiquus (resident*)
- Cassin's auklet, Ptychoramphus aleuticus (summer*)
- Parakeet auklet, Aethia psittacula (summer*)
- Least auklet, Aethia pusilla (resident*)
- Whiskered auklet, Aethia pygmaea (resident*)
- Crested auklet, Aethia cristatella (resident*)
- Rhinoceros auklet, Cerorhinca monocerata (casual)
- Horned puffin, Fratercula corniculata (summer*)
- Tufted puffin, Fratercula cirrhata (resident*)

== Gulls, terns, and skimmers ==
Order: Charadriiformes Family: Laridae

- Black-legged kittiwake, Rissa tridactyla (resident*)
- Red-legged kittiwake, Rissa brevirostris (summer*)
- Ivory gull, Pagophila eburnea (accidental)
- Sabine's gull, Xema sabini (migrant)
- Bonaparte's gull, Chroicocephalus philadelphia (accidental)
- Black-headed gull, Chroicocephalus ridibundus (migrant)
- Ross's gull, Rhodostethia rosea (casual or accidental)
- Franklin's gull, Leucophaeus pipixcan (accidental)
- Pallas's gull, Ichthyaetus ichthyaetus (accidental)
- Black-tailed gull, Larus crassirostris (casual)
- Common gull, Larus canus
- Short-billed gull, Larus brachyrhynchus
- Ring-billed gull, Larus delawarensis (accidental)
- Herring gull, Larus argentatus (migrant)
- Iceland gull, Larus glaucoides (casual)
- Lesser black-backed gull, Larus fuscus (accidental)
- Slaty-backed gull, Larus schistisagus (migrant)
- Glaucous-winged gull, Larus glaucescens (resident*)
- Glaucous gull, Larus hyperboreus (winter)
- Sooty tern, Onychoprion fuscatus (accidental)
- Aleutian tern, Onychoprion aleuticus (summer*)
- Little/Least tern, Sternula albifrons/antillarum (accidental)
- Caspian tern, Hydroprogne caspia (accidental)
- White-winged tern, Chlidonias leucopterus (accidental)
- Common tern, Sterna hirundo (intermittent)
- Arctic tern, Sterna paradisaea (summer*)

== Loons ==
Order: Gaviiformes Family: Gaviidae

- Red-throated loon, Gavia stellata (summer*)
- Arctic loon, Gavia arctica (migrant)
- Pacific loon, Gavia pacifica (migrant)
- Common loon, Gavia immer (resident*)
- Yellow-billed loon, Gavia adamsii (winter)

== Albatrosses ==
Order: Procellariiformes Family: Diomedeidae

- Salvin's albatross, Thalassarche salvini (accidental)
- Laysan albatross, Phoebastria immutabilis (summer)
- Black-footed albatross, Phoebastria nigripes (summer)
- Short-tailed albatross, Phoebastria albatrus (summer)

== Northern storm-petrels ==
Order: Procellariiformes Family: Hydrobatidae

- Fork-tailed storm-petrel, Hydrobates furcatus (resident*)
- Leach's storm-petrel, Hydrobates leucorhous (summer*)

== Shearwaters and petrels ==
Order: Procellariiformes Family: Procellariidae

- Northern fulmar, Fulmarus glacialis (resident*)
- Providence petrel, Pterodroma solandri (accidental)
- Mottled petrel, Pterodroma inexpectata (summer)
- Cook's petrel, Pterodroma cookii (casual or accidental)
- Buller's shearwater, Ardenna bulleri (accidental)
- Short-tailed shearwater, Ardenna tenuirostris (summer)
- Sooty shearwater, Ardenna griseus (summer)
- Pink-footed shearwater, Ardenna creatopus (accidental)
- Flesh-footed shearwater, Ardenna carneipes (accidental)

== Frigatebirds ==
Order: Suliformes Family: Fregatidae

- Magnificent frigatebird, Fregata magnificens (accidental)

== Boobies and gannets ==
Order: Suliformes Family: Sulidae

- Brown booby, Sula leucogaster (accidental)

== Cormorants and shags ==
Order: Suliformes Family: Phalacrocoracidae

- Red-faced cormorant, Urile urile (resident*)
- Pelagic cormorant, Urile pelagicus (resident*)
- Double-crested cormorant, Nannopterum auritum (resident*)

== Herons, egrets, and bitterns ==
Order: Pelecaniformes Family: Ardeidae

- Yellow bittern, Ixobrychus sinensis (accidental)
- Great blue heron, Ardea herodias (accidental)
- Gray heron, Ardea cinerea (accidental)
- Great egret, Ardea alba (casual)
- Intermediate egret, Egretta intermedia (accidental)
- Chinese egret, Egretta eulophotes (accidental)
- Little egret, Egretta garzetta (accidental)
- Cattle egret, Bubulcus ibis (accidental)
- Chinese pond-heron, Ardeola bacchus (accidental)
- Black-crowned night-heron, Nycticorax nycticorax (casual)

== Osprey ==
Order: Accipitriformes Family: Pandionidae

- Osprey, Pandion haliaetus (accidental)

== Hawks, eagles, and kites ==
Order: Accipitriformes Family: Accipitridae

- Golden eagle, Aquila chryaetos (resident*)
- Northern harrier, Circus hudsonius (casual)
- Sharp-shinned hawk, Accipiter striatus (accidental)
- Eurasian goshawk, Accipiter gentiles (accidental)
- American goshawk, Accipiter atricapillus (accidental)
- Black kite, Milvus migrans (accidental)
- Bald eagle, Haliaeetus leucocephalus (resident*)
- White-tailed eagle, Haliaeetus albicilla (resident*)
- Steller's sea eagle, Haliaeetus pelagicus (casual)
- Red-tailed hawk, Buteo jamaicensis (accidental)
- Rough-legged hawk, Buteo lagopus (summer*)
- Long-legged buzzard, Buteo rufinus (accidental)

== Owls ==
Order: Strigiformes Family: Strigidae

- Oriental scops-owl, Otus sunia (accidental)
- Great Horned owl, Bubo virginianus (accidental)
- Snowy owl, Bubo scandiacus (resident*)
- Long-eared owl, Asio otus (accidental)
- Short-eared owl, Aso flammeus (summer*)
- Boreal owl, Aegolius funereus (accidental)
- Northern saw-whet owl, Aegolius acadicus (accidental)
- Northern boobook, Ninox scutulata (accidental)

== Kingfishers ==
Order: Coraciiformes Family: Alcedinidae

- Belted kingfisher, Megaceryle alcyon (resident*)

== Woodpeckers ==
Order: Piciformes Family: Picidae

- Black-backed woodpecker, Picoides arcticus (accidental)
- Great spotted woodpecker, Dendrocopos major (casual)
- Downy woodpecker, Dryobates pubescens (accidental)
- Northern flicker, Colaptes auratus (accidental)

== Falcons and caracaras ==
Order: Falconiformes Family: Falconidae

- Eurasian kestrel, Falco tinnunculus (casual)
- Merlin, Falco columbarius (casual or intermittent)
- Eurasian hobby, Falco subbuteo (casual)
- Gyrfalcon, Falco rusticolus (resident*)
- Peregrine falcon, Falco peregrinus (resident*)

== Tyrant flycatchers ==
Order: Passeriformes Family: Tyrannidae

- Eastern kingbird, Tyrannus tyrannus (accidental)
- Olive-sided flycatcher, Contopus cooperi (accidental)
- Western wood-pewee, Contopus sordidulus (accidental)
- Yellow-bellied flycatcher, Empidonax flaviventris (accidental)
- Alder flycatcher, Empidonax alnorum (accidental)
- Say's phoebe, Sayornis saya (accidental)

== Vireos, shrike-babblers, and erpornis ==
Order: Passeriformes Family: Vireonidae

- Warbling vireo, Vireo gilvus (accidental)

== Shrikes ==
Order: Passeriformes Family: Laniidae

- Brown shrike, Lanius cristatus (accidental)
- Northern shrike, Lanius borealis (casual or intermittent)

== Crows, jays, and magpies ==
Order: Passeriformes Family: Corvidae

- Black-billed magpie, Pica hudsonia (resident*)
- American crow, Corvus brachyrhynchos
- Common raven, Corvus corax (resident*)

== Tits, chickadees, and titmice ==
Order: Passeriformes Family: Paridae

- Black-capped chickadee, Poecile atricapillus (resident*)

== Larks ==
Order: Passeriformes Family: Alaudidae

- Eurasian skylark, Alauda arvensis (intermittent)
- Horned lark, Eremophila alpestris (casual)

== Grassbirds and allies ==
Order: Passeriformes Family: Locustellidae

- Middendorff's grasshopper warbler, Helopsaltes ochotensis (casual)
- Lanceolated warbler, Locustella lanceolata (casual or accidental)

== Swallows ==
Order: Passeriformes Family: Hirundinidae

- Bank swallow, Riparia riparia (summer*)
- Tree swallow, Tachycineta bicolor (casual or intermittent)
- Violet-green swallow, Tachycineta thalassina (casual or intermittent)
- Northern rough-winged swallow, Stelgidopteryx serripennis (accidental)
- Purple martin, Progne subis (accidental)
- Barn swallow, Hirundo rustica (casual)
- Common house-martin, Delichon urbicum (accidental)
- Cliff swallow, Petrochelidon pyrrhonota (casual)

== Leaf warblers ==
Order: Passeriformes Family: Phylloscopidae

- Willow warbler, Phylloscopus trochilus (accidental)
- Common chiffchaff, Phylloscopus collybita (accidental)
- Wood warbler, Phylloscopus sibilatrix (accidental)
- Dusky warbler, Phylloscopus fuscatus (casual)
- Yellow-browed warbler, Phylloscopus inornatus (accidental)
- Arctic warbler, Phylloscopus borealis (intermittent)
- Kamchatka leaf warbler, Phylloscopus examinandus (accidental)

== Kinglets ==
Order: Passeriformes Family: Regulidae

- Ruby-crowned kinglet, Corthylio calendula
- Golden-crowned kinglet, Regulus satrapa

== Waxwings ==
Order: Passeriformes Family: Bombycillidae

- Bohemian waxwing, Bombycilla garrulus (casual or accidental)
- Cedar waxwing, Bombycilla cedrorum (accidental)

== Nuthatches ==
Order: Passeriformes Family: Sittidae

- Red-breasted nuthatch, Sitta canadensis (accidental)

== Wrens ==
Order: Passeriformes Family: Troglodytidae

- Pacific wren, Troglodytes pacificus

== Mockingbirds and thrashers ==
Order: Passeriformes Family: Mimidae

- Northern mockingbird, Mimus polyglottos (accidental)

== Starlings ==
Order: Passeriformes Family: Sturnidae

- European starling, Sturnus vulgaris (accidental)

== Dippers ==
Order: Passeriformes Family: Cinclidae

- American dipper, Cinclus mexicanus (resident*)

== Thrushes and allies ==
Order: Passeriformes Family: Turdidae

- Mountain bluebird, Sialia currucoides (accidental)
- Gray-cheeked thrush, Catharus minimus
- Swainson's thrush, Catharus ustulatus (accidental)
- Hermit thrush, Catharus guttatus (summer*)
- Wood thrush, Hylocichla mustelina (accidental)
- Eyebrowed thrush, Turdus obscurus (migrant)
- Dusky thrush, Turdus eunomus (intermittent)
- American robin, Turdus migratorius (casual)
- Varied thrush, Ixoreus naevius

== Old World flycatchers ==
Order: Passeriformes Family: Muscicapidae

- Gray-streaked flycatcher, Muscicapa griseisticta (intermittent)
- Asian brown flycatcher, Muscicapa dauurica (casual or accidental)
- Dark-sided flycatcher, Muscicapa sibirica (casual)
- Siberian blue robin, Larvivora cyane (accidental)
- Rufous-tailed robin, Larvivora sibilans (accidental)
- Bluethroat, Cyanecula svecica
- Siberian rubythroat, Calliope calliope (migrant)
- Red-flanked bluetail, Tarsiger cyanurus (casual)
- Narcissus flycatcher, Ficedula narcissina (casual or accidental)
- Mugimaki flycatcher, Ficedula mugimaki (accidental)
- Taiga flycatcher, Ficedula albicilla (intermittent)
- Common redstart, Phoenicurus phoenicurus (accidental)
- Northern wheatear, Oenanthe oenanthe (intermittent)

== Accentors ==
Order: Passeriformes Family: Prunellidae

- Siberian accentor, Prunella montanella (accidental)

== Wagtails and pipits ==
Order: Passeriformes Family: Motacillidae

- Eastern yellow wagtail, Motacilla tschutschensis (migrant)
- Gray wagtail, Motacilla cinerea (intermittent)
- White wagtail, Motacilla alba (migrant)
- Olive-backed pipit, Anthus hodgsoni (intermittent or casual)
- Pechora pipit, Anthus gustavi (casual)
- Red-throated pipit, Anthus cervinus (intermittent)
- American pipit, Anthus rubescens (summer*)

== Finches, euphonias, and allies ==
Order: Passeriformes Family: Fringillidae

- Brambling, Fringilla montifringilla (migrant)
- Hawfinch, Coccothraustes coccothraustes (accidental)
- Common rosefinch, Carpodacus erythrinus (accidental)
- Pallas's rosefinch, Carpodacus roseus (accidental)
- Pine grosbeak, Pinicola enucleator (resident*)
- Eurasian bullfinch, Pyrrhula pyrrhula (accidental)
- Asian rosy-finch, Leucosticte tephrocotis (accidental)
- Gray-crowned rosy-finch, Leucosticte tephrocotis (resident*)
- Purple finch, Haemorhous purpureus (accidental)
- Oriental greenfinch, Chloris sinica (accidental)
- Common redpoll, Acanthis flammea
- Hoary redpoll, Acanthis hornemanni
- Red crossbill, Loxia curvirostra
- White-winged crossbill, Loxia leucoptera
- Eurasian siskin, Spinus spinus (accidental)
- Pine siskin, Spinus pinus

== Longspurs and snow buntings ==
Order: Passeriformes Family: Calcariidae

- Lapland longspur, Calcarius lapponicus (summer*)
- Snow bunting, Plectrophenax nivalis (resident*)
- McKay's bunting, Plectrophenax hyperboreus (casual or intermittent)

== Old World buntings ==
Order: Passeriformes Family: Emberizidae

- Pine bunting, Emberiza leucocephalos (casual or accidental)
- Little bunting, Emberiza pusilla (casual)
- Rustic bunting, Emberiza rustica (intermittent)
- Yellow-throated bunting, Emberiza elegans (accidental)
- Yellow-breasted bunting, Emberiza aureola (casual)
- Gray bunting, Emberiza variabilis (casual)
- Pallas's bunting, Emberiza pallasi (accidental)
- Reed bunting, Emberiza schoeniclus (casual)

== New World sparrows ==
Order: Passeriformes Family: Passerellidae

- Chipping sparrow, Spizella passerina (accidental)
- Fox sparrow, Passerella iliaca (summer*)
- American tree sparrow, Spizelloides arborea (accidental)
- Dark-eyed junco, Junco hyemalis (casual)
- White-crowned sparrow, Zonotrichia leucophrys (accidental)
- Golden-crowned sparrow, Zonotrichia atricapilla
- Savannah sparrow, Passerculus sandwichensis (summer*)
- Song sparrow, Melospiza melodia (resident*)
- Lincoln's sparrow, Melospiza lincolnii (accidental)

== Troupials and allies ==
Order: Passeriformes Family: Icteridae

- Red-winged blackbird, Agelaius phoeniceus (accidental)
- Brown-headed cowbird, Molothrus ater (accidental)
- Rusty blackbird, Euphagus carolinus (accidental)
- Brewer's blackbird, Euphagus cyanocephalus (accidental)

== New World warblers ==
Order: Passeriformes Family: Parulidae

- Ovenbird, Seiurus aurocapilla (accidental)
- Northern waterthrush, Parkesia noveboracensis (accidental)
- Tennessee warbler, Leiothlypis peregrina (accidental)
- Orange-crowned warbler, Leiothlypis celata (casual)
- Cape May warbler, Setophaga tigrina (accidental)
- Magnolia warbler, Setophaga magnolia (accidental)
- Yellow warbler, Setophaga petechia (summer*)
- Blackpoll warbler, Setophaga striata (accidental)
- Palm warbler, Setophaga palmarum (accidental)
- Yellow-rumped warbler, Setophaga coronata (casual)
- Townsend's warbler, Setophaga townsendi (accidental)
- Wilson's warbler, Cardellina pusilla (summer*)

== Cardinals and allies ==
Order: Passeriformes Family: Cardinalidae

- Western tanager, Piranga ludoviciana (accidental)

== See also ==
- List of birds of Alaska
- List of birds of the United States
