= Chirinkotan =

Island in the Kuril Island chain

Native name: Чиринкотан (Russian); 知林古丹島 (Japanese)
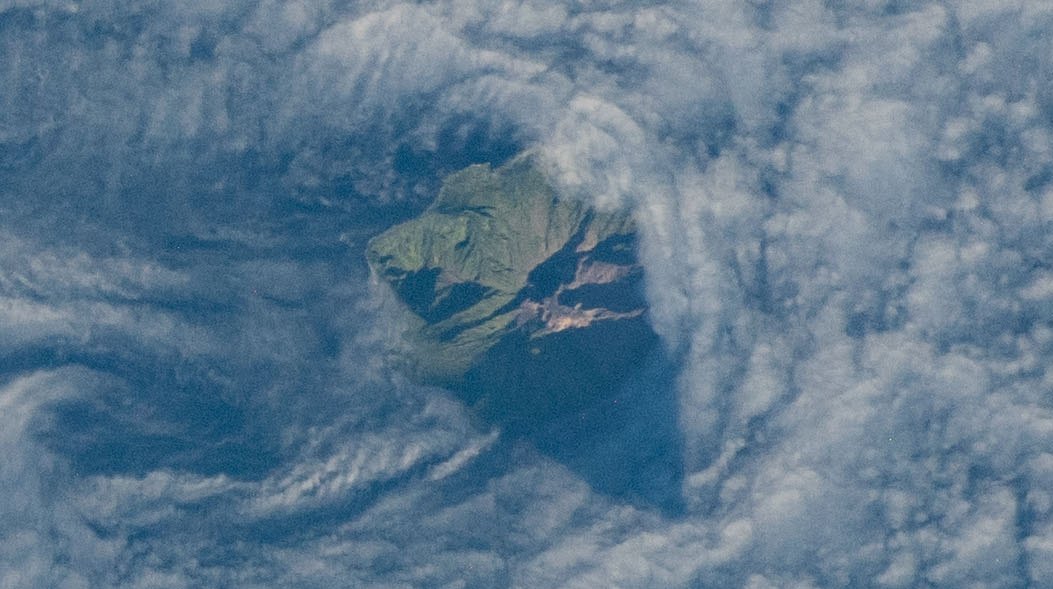
- Astronaut photograph of Chirinkotan Island from the International Space Station

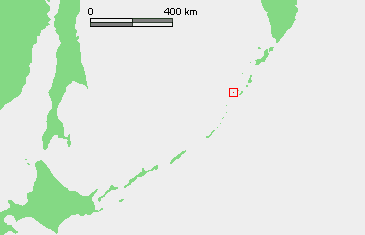

Geography
- Location: Sea of Okhotsk
- Coordinates: 48.98°N 153.48°E
- Archipelago: Kuril Islands
- Area: 6 km^{2} (2.3 sq mi)
- Highest elevation: 742 m (2434 ft)
- Highest point: Masaochi Peak volcano (last eruption 2013 to 2014)

Administration
- Russia

Demographics
- Population: 0

Chirinkotan (Russian: Чиринкотан; Japanese: 知林古丹島, romanized: Chirinkotan-tō) is an uninhabited volcanic island located in the centre of the Kuril Islands chain in the Sea of Okhotsk in the northwest Pacific Ocean. Its name is derived from the Ainu language for "mudslide". It is located 3 kilometres (1.9 miles) west of Ekarma, its nearest neighbor.

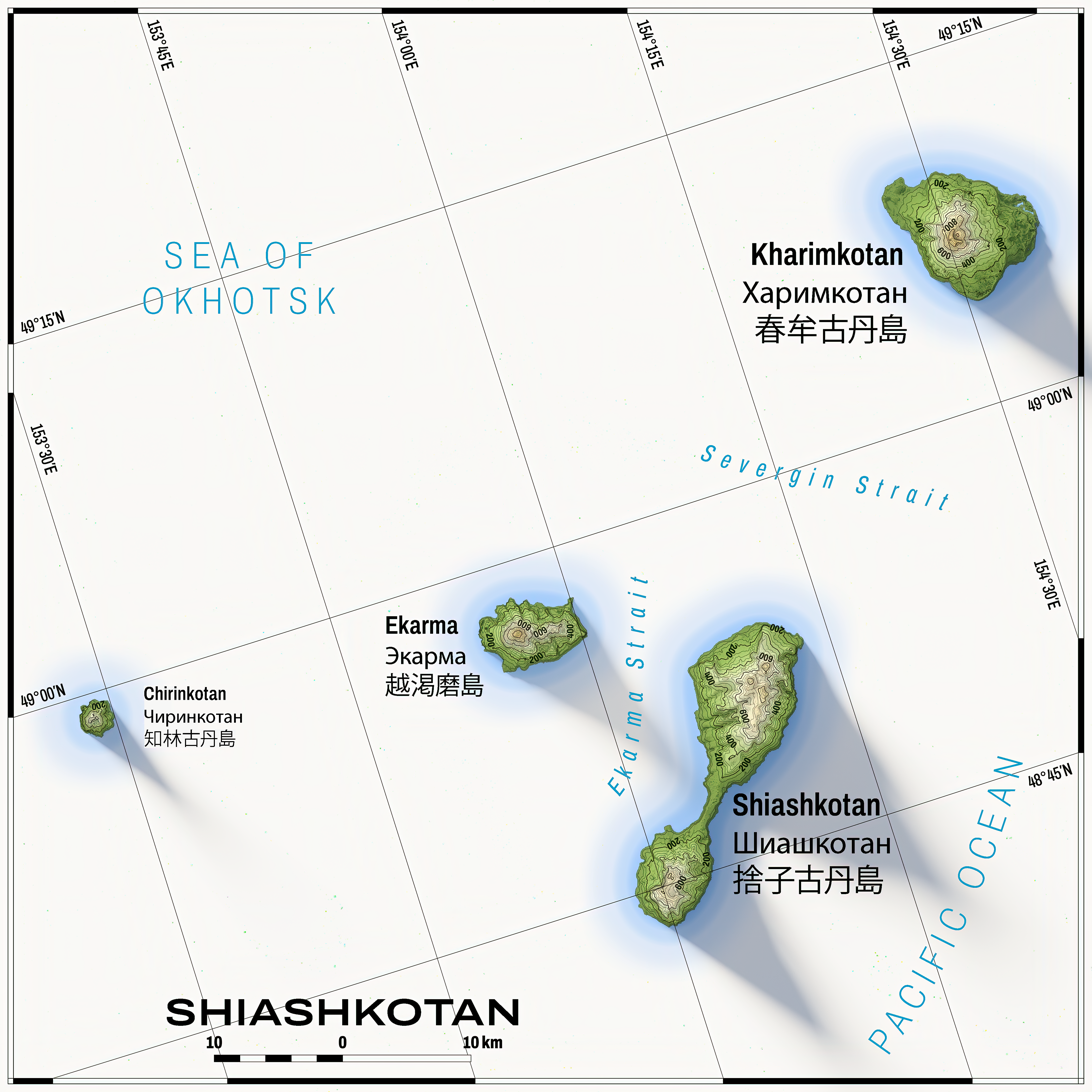
Topographic map of Shiashkotan and nearby islands including Chirinkotan

== Geology ==
Chirinkotan is at the far end of a volcanic chain extending nearly 50 km west of the central part of the main Kuril Islands arc. The island is the top of a partially submerged stratovolcano rising approximately 3,000 metres (9,800 feet) from the floor of the Sea of Okhotsk, and is roughly circular with an area of 6 square kilometres (2.3 square miles). The island's highest point ("Masaochi" in Ainu) is 742 metres (2,434 feet) high, and is still an active volcano with major eruptions recorded in 1760, 1884, 1900, 1979, 1986, 2004, and 2013. Reports of a 1955 eruption are unconfirmed. The caldera is approximately one kilometre (0.62 miles) wide, with a depth of 300 to 400 metres (980–1,310 feet), and is breached on its south-east side. The shores of the island are steep cliffs, making landing by small boat impossible.

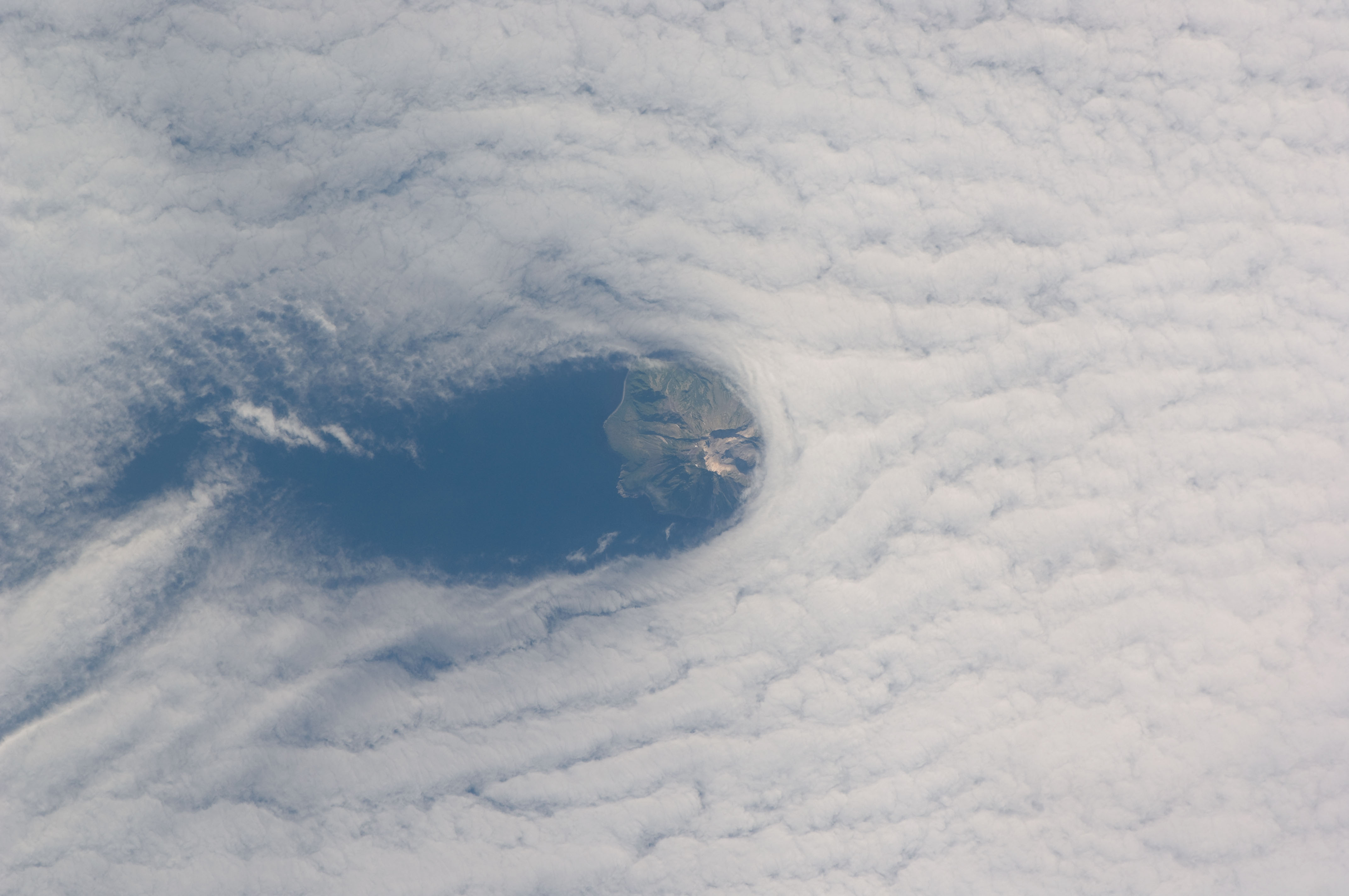
Astronaut photograph of Chirinkotan Island from the International Space Station

== History ==
Chirinkotan has had no permanent habitation. Claimed by the Empire of Russia, sovereignty was passed to the Empire of Japan per the Treaty of Saint Petersburg along with the rest of the Kuril Islands. The island was formerly administered as part of Shumushu District of Nemuro Subprefecture of Hokkaidō. After World War II, the island came under the control of the Soviet Union, and is now administered as part of the Sakhalin Oblast of the Russian Federation.

== Fauna ==
In the spring and early summer crested, whiskered, and parakeet auklet nest on the island.

== See also ==
- List of volcanoes in Russia
