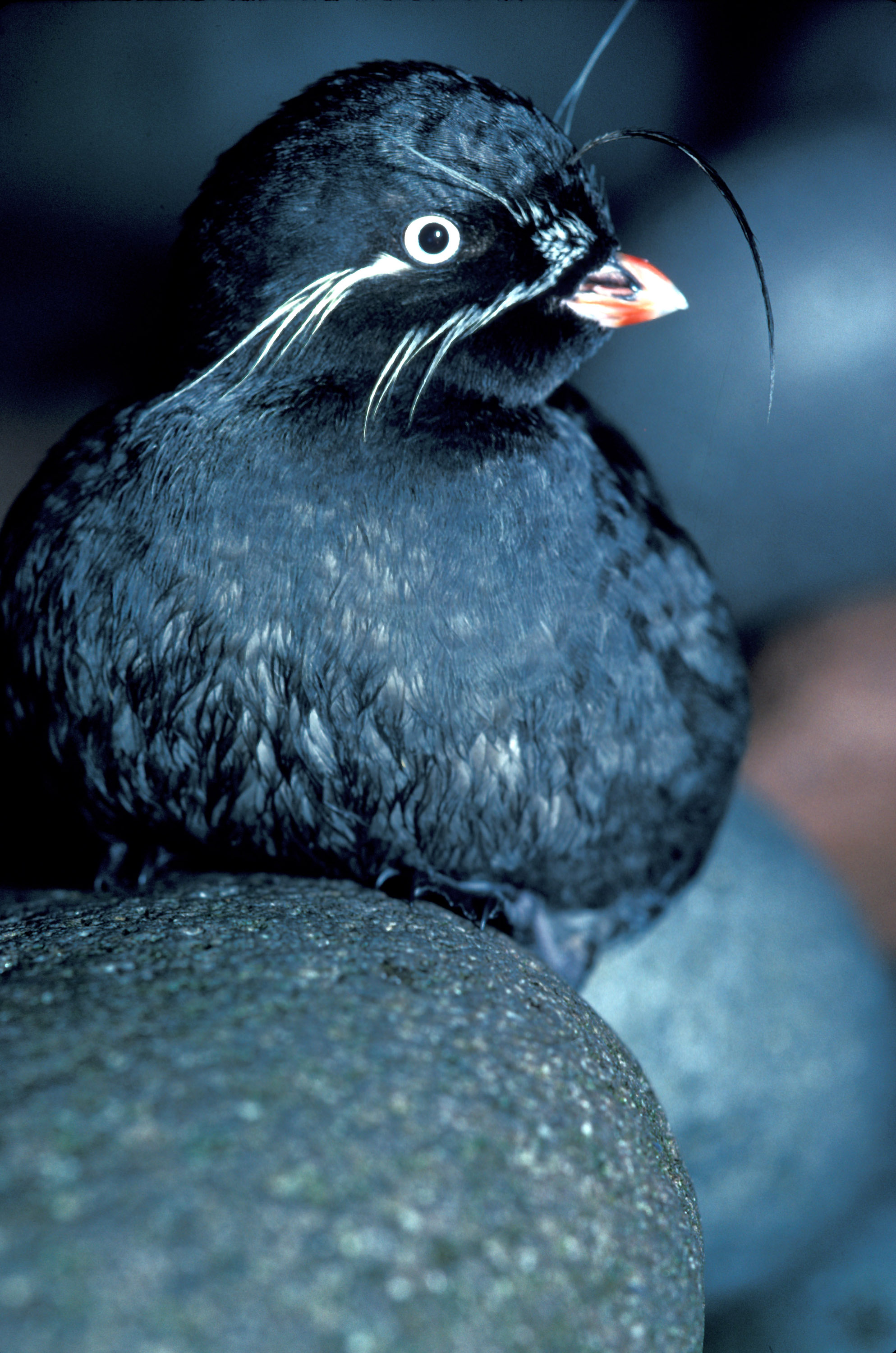
- Whiskered auklet (Aethia pygmaea)

Scientific classification
- Kingdom: Animalia
- Phylum: Chordata
- Class: Aves
- Order: Charadriiformes
- Family: Alcidae
- Tribe: Aethiini
- Genus: Aethia; Merrem, 1788

Type species
- Alca cristatella Pallas, 1769

Species
- Aethia cristatella; Aethia psittacula; Aethia pusilla; Aethia pygmaea

= Aethia =

Genus of birds

Aethia is a genus of four small (85–300g) auklets endemic to the North Pacific Ocean, Bering Sea and Sea of Okhotsk and among some of North America's most abundant seabirds. The relationships between the four true auklets remains unclear. Auklets are threatened by invasive species such as Norway rats (Rattus norvegicus) because of their high degree of coloniality and crevice-nesting.

== Taxonomy and evolution ==
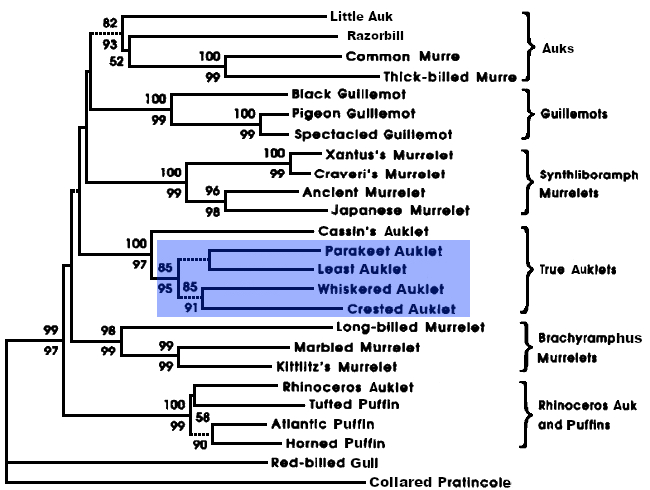
Current accepted taxonomy of the Alcidae with Aethia shown in blue. Modified from Friesen et al. 1996. Mol. Biol. Evol. 13, 359–367.

The genus Aethia occurs only in the North Pacific and adjacent waters, mainly in the Bering Sea region. Along with Cassin's auklet (Ptychoramphus aleuticus) they comprise the monophyletic tribe Aethinii. Molecular work has not yet resolved the relationship between the Aethia auklets, but the group is a sister group to Cassin's auklet, which is, in turn, a sister group to the Fraterculine auks (puffins and rhinoceros auklet).

The genus Aethia did not enter into widespread use until the 1960s. Initially, the auklets were placed in Alca, but later reorganized into genera including: Simorhynchus, Phaleris and Cyclorhynchus. Cyclorhynchus is still occasionally used for the parakeet auklet.

=== Fossil record ===
The first undisputed auk fossils are from the middle Miocene (15 million years ago). The first Aethia fossils date from the late Miocene (8–13 million years ago) and the four extant species likely diverged rapidly about 5 million years ago.

There are one or two fossil species which lived in the area of today's California during the Late Miocene: Aethia rossmoori Howard, 1968 (Monterrey Formation of Orange County), and an undescribed taxon tentatively placed in this genus. From the Pliocene there are Aethia barnesi N. A. Smith, 2013 San Mateo Formation of San Diego County, California, and Aethia storeri N. A. Smith, 2013 San Mateo Formation of San Diego County, California.

=== Species ===
There are four species of Aethia. Censusing breeding auklets can be difficult because they nest in hidden crevices.

Genus Aethia – Merrem, 1788 – four species
Common name	Scientific name and subspecies	Range	Size and ecology	IUCN status and estimated population
Least auklet	Aethia pusilla (Pallas, 1811)	Alaska and Siberia	Size: Habitat: Diet:	LC 20,000,000+
Crested auklet	Aethia cristatella (Pallas, 1769)	northern Pacific and the Bering Sea	Size: Habitat: Diet:	LC 5,000,000 - 10,000,000
Whiskered auklet	Aethia pygmaea (Gmelin, JF, 1789)	Aleutian Islands and on some islands off Siberia	Size: Habitat: Diet:	LC 100,000 - 250,000
Parakeet auklet	Aethia psittacula (Pallas, 1769)	Alaska, Kamchatka and Siberia	Size: Habitat: Diet:	LC 1,000,000 - 2,000,000

== Distribution ==
=== Breeding season ===
Aethia auklets are endemic to the North Pacific Ocean and Sea of Okhotsk with notable Asian colonies in the Kuril Islands, Commander Islands, along the Kamchatka and Chukota Peninsulas. In North America, large colonies are in the Aleutian Islands (Buldir, Kiska, Semisopochnoi and Gareloi) to the Gulf of Alaska and north to the islands of the Bering Sea (St. Lawrence Island, Pribilof Islands, St. Matthew Island).

Auklets have a high site fidelity, at both the colony and crevice level, although there can be a high divorce rate of up to 33% in least and crested auklets when both mates survive.

=== Winter distribution ===
The Winter distribution of auklets is poorly known. Whiskered auklets likely winter near to breeding colonies and many were reported by Aleuts to winter in the general area. Auklets from the northern Bering Sea must move further south because of pack ice surrounding colonies during the winter.

== Breeding ==
Auklets are typically very social and nest in dense colonies (Parakeet auklets are more dispersed). All have some form of facial ornamentation such as large crests (Whiskered and crested auklets), auricular plumes (all four species), and crested and whiskered auklets have a tangerine-scented odour which may function in mate choice or species recognition, although this requires more study.

All Aethia auklets lay one white egg in a natural crevice and incubate for 25–36 days, after which, a semi-precocial chick emerges and fledges after 25–35 days. Age at first breeding is estimated at 3–5 years. Colony sizes are highly variable, and range from less than 100 individuals to over 1 million, although least and crested auklets tend to nest in greater density than parakeet and whiskered auklets.

== Diet ==
The auklets are mainly planktivores, eating a variety of calanoid copepods, euphausiids and other invertebrates such as jellyfish and ctenophores. Winter diet has not been studied.

== Threats and conservation ==
Because they nest in crevices, auklets are vulnerable to predation by rats, and have been extirpated from some islands that contained Arctic foxes introduced for farming. Eradication of rats from Rat Island was completed in 2008 and 2009.

The large colony at Sirius Point, Kiska Island, Alaska (perhaps the largest auklet colony in the world) experienced almost complete breeding failure in 2001 and 2002 because of rat predation and disturbance and has been the focus of researchers at Memorial University of Newfoundland.
