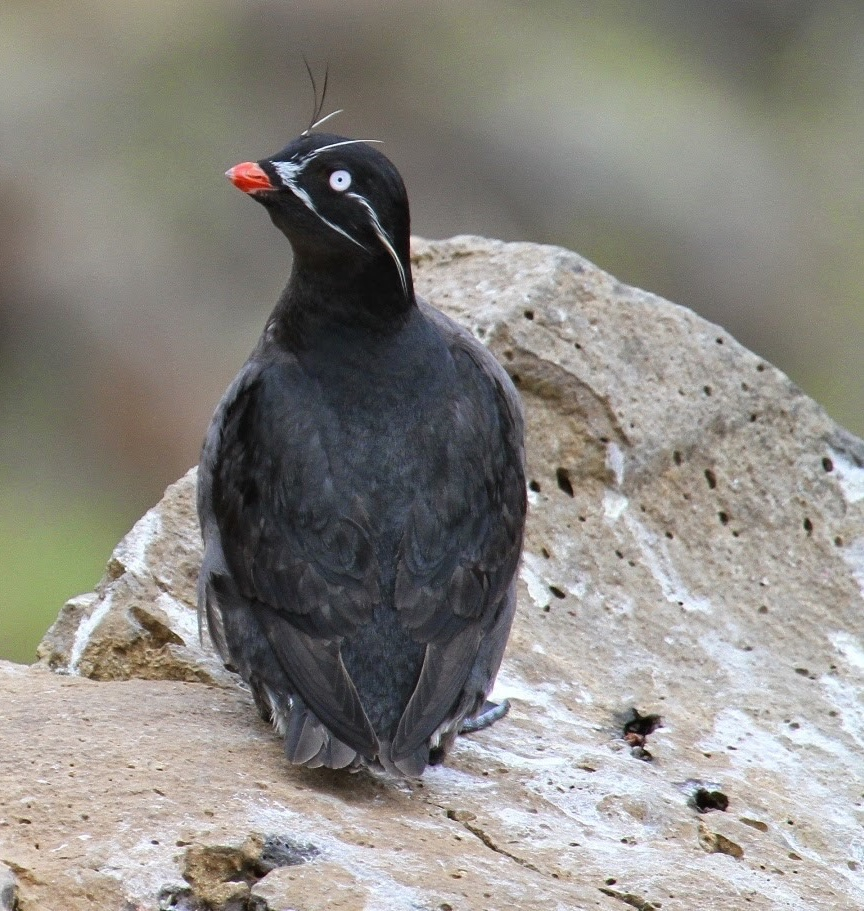

Conservation status
- Least Concern (IUCN 3.1)

Scientific classification
- Kingdom: Animalia
- Phylum: Chordata
- Class: Aves
- Order: Charadriiformes
- Family: Alcidae
- Genus: Aethia
- Species: A. pygmaea

Binomial name
- Aethia pygmaea (Gmelin, JF, 1789)

= Whiskered auklet =

Species of bird

The whiskered auklet (Aethia pygmaea) is a small seabird of the auk family. It has a more restricted range than other members of its genus, Aethia, living only around the Aleutian Islands and on some islands off Siberia (like Commander Islands), and breeding on these islands. It is one of the smallest alcids, only the closely related least auklet being smaller. Its name is derived from the long white feathers on its face that are part of its breeding plumage.

The whiskered auklet is a poorly studied species and much research needs to be undertaken on the species. It was originally described as two different species, from specimens collected at different ends of its range, however research has shown that it is a single species with clinal variation along its range. It is not thought to undertake migration, but instead attends its breeding islands year round, and has been shown to roost on land all year round, an unusual trait in the family. Whiskered auklets lay a single egg in a rocky crevice, in loose colonies with other whiskered auklets and also other colonial seabirds. Both parents take part in incubation and chick rearing. The whiskers have been shown to help them sense their way to and out of their nests at night.

Whiskered auklets feed in the inshore zone, usually within 16 km of land, where tidal currents concentrate their prey into dense swarms. They feed predominantly on copepods during the summer months, mostly on the species Neocalanus plumchrus; and switching to euphausiid krill in the fall and winter.

== Taxonomy ==
The whiskered auklet was formally described in 1789 by the German naturalist Johann Friedrich Gmelin in his revised and expanded edition of Carl Linnaeus's Systema Naturae. He placed it with the other auks in the genus Alca and coined the binomial name Alca pygmaea. Gmelin based his description on the "flat-billed auk" that had been described by the English ornithologist John Latham in 1785 and the "pygmy auk" that had been described by Welsh naturalist Thomas Pennant in the same year. Both authors had given the locality as Bird Island (now St Matthew Island) in the Bering Sea. The whiskered auklet is now one of four small auks placed in the genus Aethia that was introduced by the German naturalist Blasius Merrem in 1788. The genus name Aethia is from the Ancient Greek aithuia, an unidentified seabird mentioned by Aristotle. The specific epithet pygmaea is from Latin pygmaeus meaning "dwarf" or "pygmy". The species is monotypic: no subspecies are recognised.

== Description ==
An odd characteristic of this bird, which is also shared with the crested auklet, is that its plumage smells of citrus.

Fishing boats pose a huge threat to this bird, since it is attracted to lights at night.
