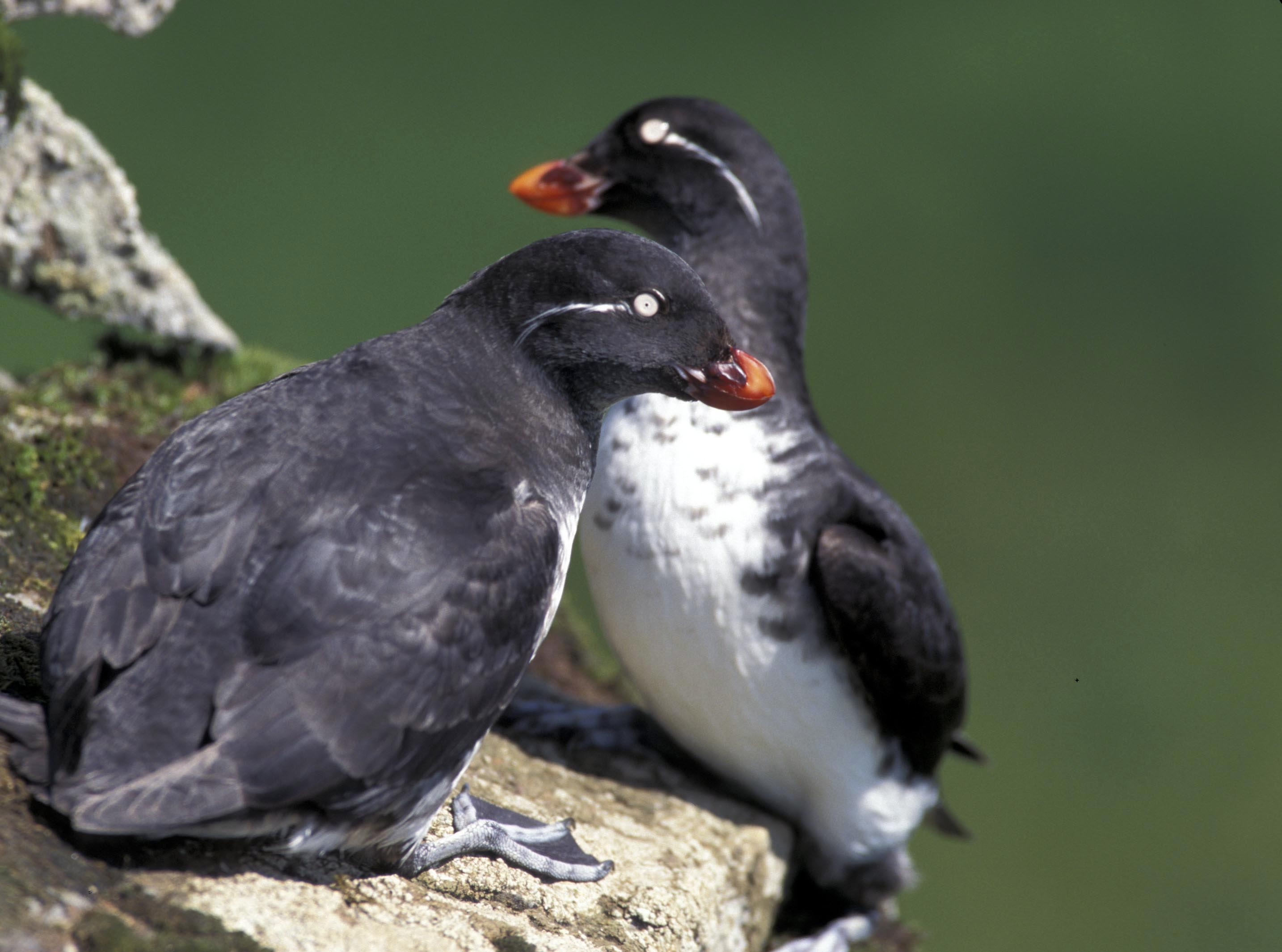

Conservation status
- Least Concern (IUCN 3.1)

Scientific classification
- Kingdom: Animalia
- Phylum: Chordata
- Class: Aves
- Order: Charadriiformes
- Family: Alcidae
- Genus: Aethia
- Species: A. psittacula

Binomial name
- Aethia psittacula (Pallas, 1769)

Synonyms
- Cyclorrhynchus psittacula Phaleris psittacula

= Parakeet auklet =

Species of bird

The parakeet auklet (Aethia psittacula) is a small seabird of the North Pacific. Parakeet Auklets used to be placed on its own in the genus Cyclorrhynchus (Kaup, 1829) but recent morphological and genetic evidence suggest it should be placed in the genus Aethia, making them closely related to crested auklets and least auklets. It is associated with the boreal waters of Alaska, Kamchatka and Siberia. It breeds on the cliffs, slopes and boulder fields of offshore islands, generally moving south during the winter.

== Description ==
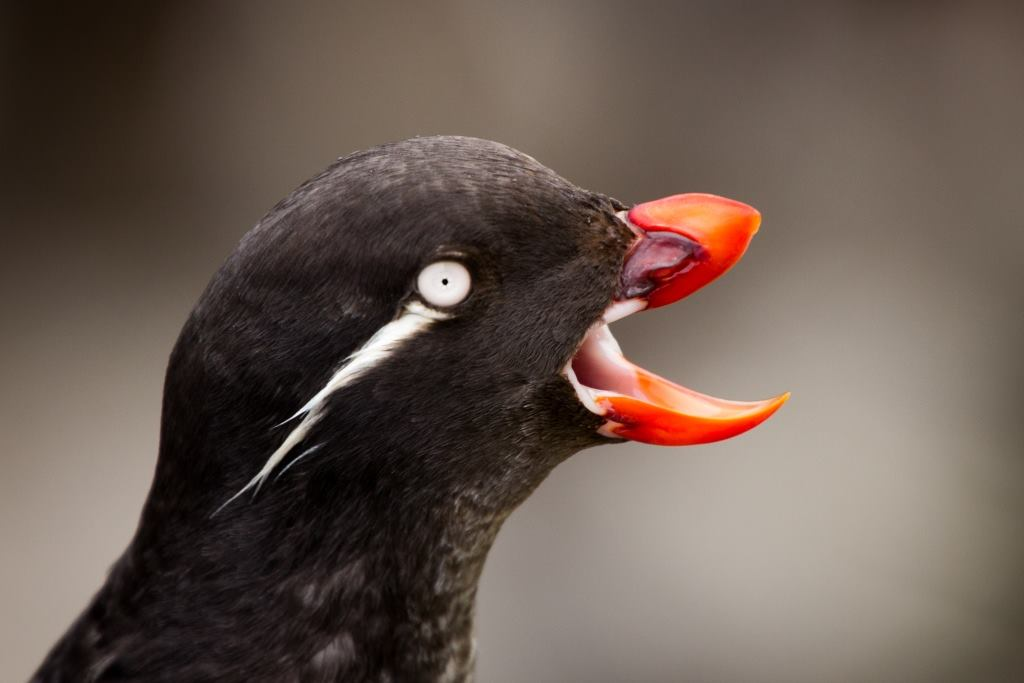
Closeup of the head, Pribilof Islands, Alaska

The parakeet auklet is a small (23 cm) auk with a short orange bill that is upturned to give the bird its curious fixed expression. The upward bend of the beak has been observed to provide advantages in picking up small food pieces from the sea bottom as well as in assisting in the disintegration of larger food objects. The bird's plumage is dark above and white below. with a single white plume projecting back from the eye. There is a small amount of variation between breeding and winter plumage.

The parakeet auklet is a highly vocal species at the nest, calling once it arrives at the nest and then duetting once its mate arrives. It makes a series of rhythmic hoarse calls (like that of the Cassin's auklet) and a quavering squeal. The function of these are unknown, but could be associated with defending its burrow from intruders and strengthening the bond with its mate.

== Behaviour and breeding ==
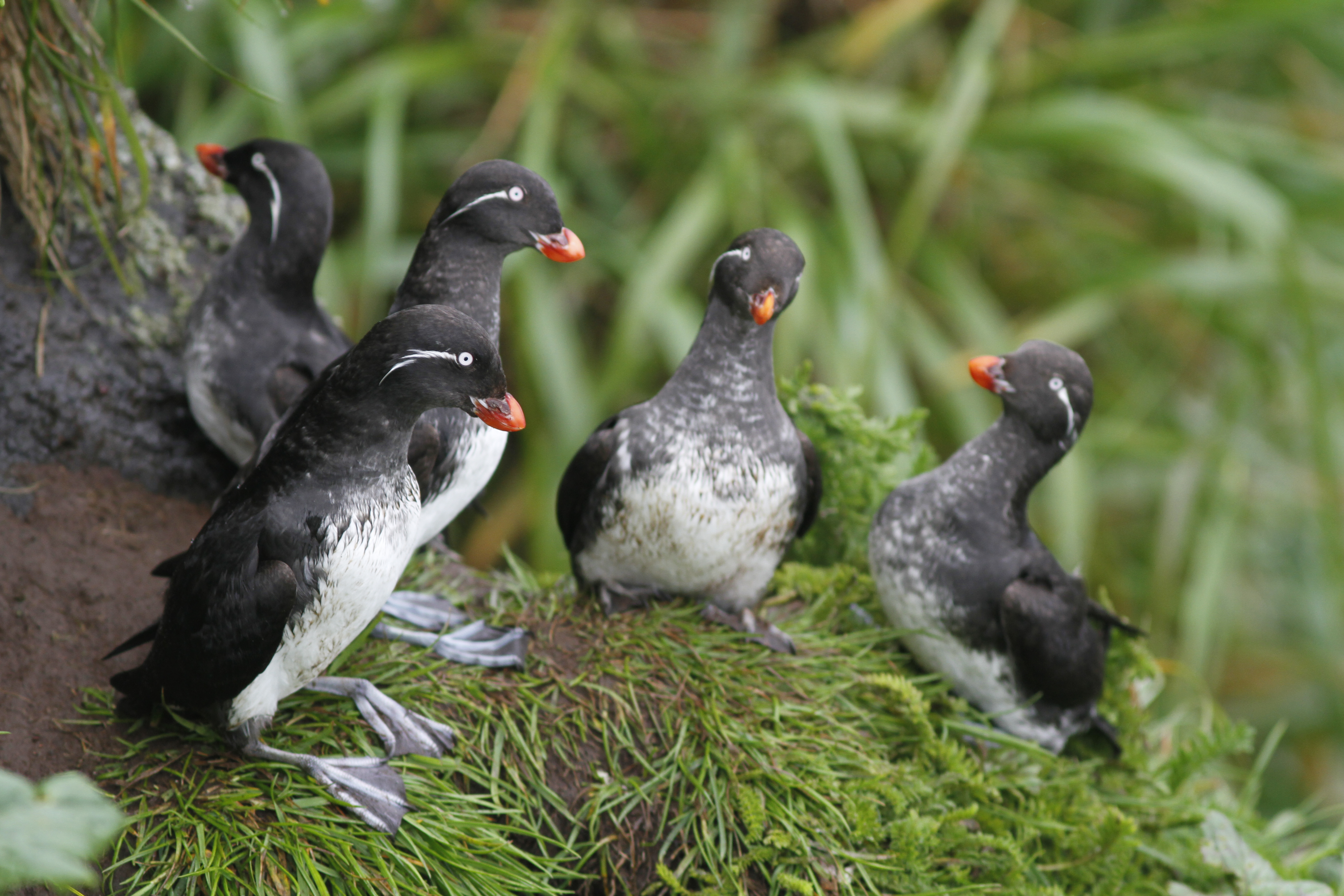
The parakeet auklet is highly social in its breeding colonies.

The parakeet auklet's food varies with season, during the breeding season it takes mostly small planktonic crustaceans such as euphausiids, copepods and amphipods. Recent research shows it also preys on jellyfish in some areas. It often feeds at a considerable distance from the colony, diving up to 30 m to reach its prey.

Breeding begins in April and May in colonies that are often shared with other auk species. Their eggs are laid in the crevices of the cliff, often several feet in and by a crooked path so that it is impossible to reach them. The pair lay one egg, which is incubated for just over a month, the chick is then fed 4 times a day for around 35 days. The chick fledges at night, flying out to sea alone.

== Relationship with humans ==
The parakeet auklet has little contact with humans despite its large population, this is largely due to their remote breeding and wintering. However, the parakeet auklet still faces issues caused by marine pollution and ingestion of small plastics.

== Status and conservation ==
The parakeet auklet is not considered threatened, there are estimated to be over a million individuals in the North Pacific. It is not thought to have declined recently, but may be threatened in the future by introduced predators and oil spills.
