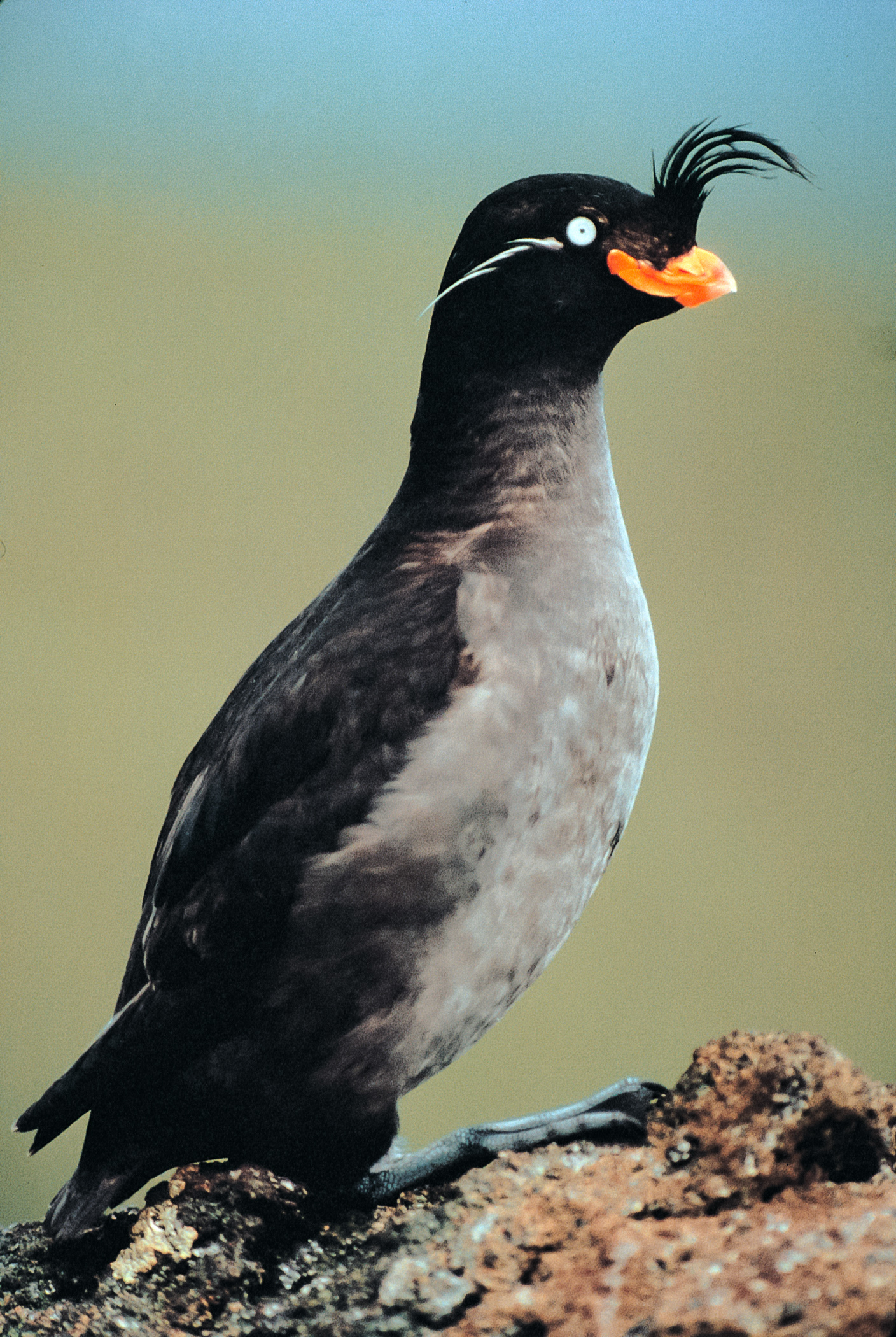

Conservation status
- Least Concern (IUCN 3.1)

Scientific classification
- Kingdom: Animalia
- Phylum: Chordata
- Class: Aves
- Order: Charadriiformes
- Family: Alcidae
- Genus: Aethia
- Species: A. cristatella

Binomial name
- Aethia cristatella (Pallas, 1769)

Synonyms
- Alca cristatella Simorhynchus cristatellus

= Crested auklet =

Species of bird

The crested auklet (Aethia cristatella) is a small seabird of the family Alcidae, distributed throughout the northern Pacific and the Bering Sea. The species feeds by diving in deep waters, eating krill and a variety of small marine animals. It nests in dense colonies of up to 1 million individuals in the Bering Sea and the Sea of Okhotsk. It often breeds in mixed-species colonies with the least auklet, a smaller congener.

The species is known for its sexual ornaments, found in both males and females. These include colorful plumage with a forehead crest, a striking scent recalling citrus fruit, and a loud trumpet call, all of which appear to have evolved through sexual selection. The total population is around 6 million, almost half in North America. It is in general considered to be of least concern, though the Alaskan population faces additional threats from predation and oil spills.

== Taxonomy ==
The crested auklet was first described as Alca cristatella in 1769 by the German zoologist Peter Simon Pallas. The specific epithet cristatella is Neo-Latin for "little crested" from Latin cristatus "crested" or "plumed". It is now placed in the genus Aethia that was introduced by the German naturalist Blasius Merrem in 1788. The genus includes four auklet species. There are no recognised subspecies of the crested auklet. Within the genus, it is most closely related to the whiskered auklet (A. pygmaea). The family Alcidae consists of many species of shorebirds including other auklets (not in the genus Aethia), puffins, razorbills, guillemots, and murres.

== Description ==
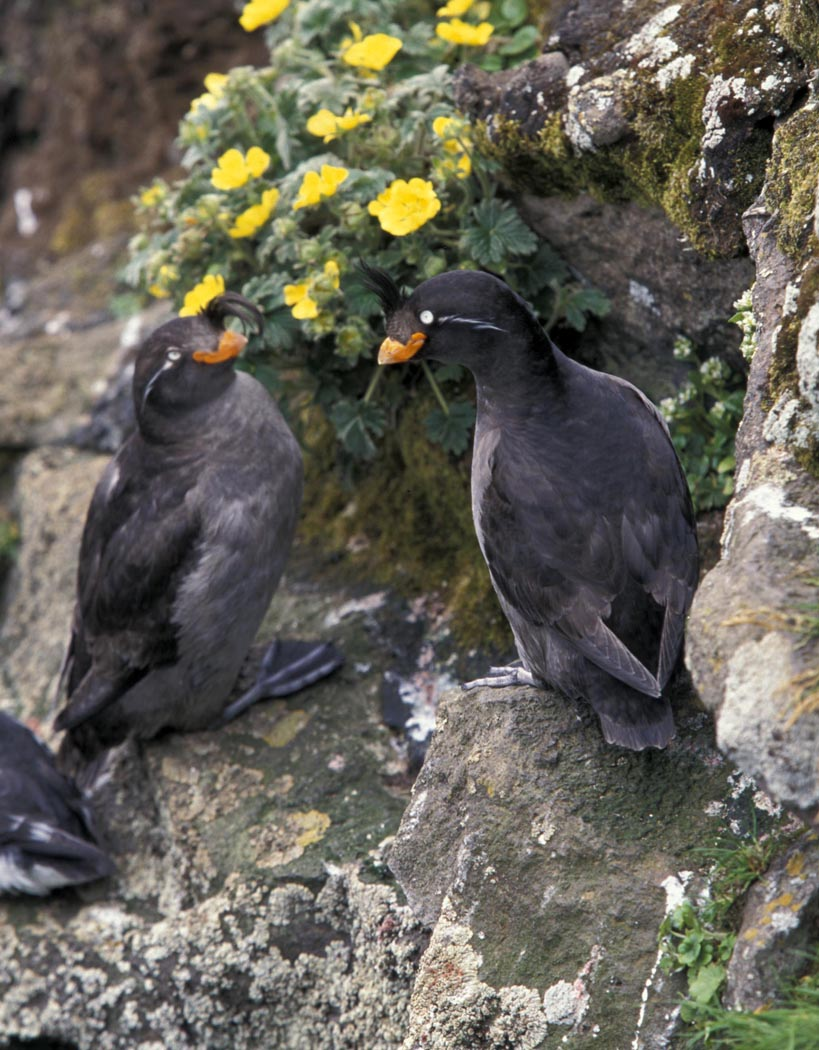
Pair

The crested auklet can measure 18–27 cm (7.1–10.6 in) in length, 34–50 cm (13–20 in) in wingspan and weigh 195–330 g (6.9–11.6 oz). They have a reddish-orange and yellow tipped bill, yellowish white irises, and white auricular plumes from their eyes to their ears. Their bodies, wings, and tails are primarily dark sooty grey, while their legs and feet are grey and claws black. The males and females are very similar, although the females have slightly smaller and less curved bills, additionally slightly smaller crests.

Crested auklets are known for their forehead crests, which is made of black forward-curving feathers. These forehead crests are highly variable, and can have between two and twenty three narrow forward curving feathers. The average auklet has 12 crest feathers, which are of variable length, between 8.1 and 58.5 millimetres. Auklets have auricular plumes and a bright orange bill with curved accessory plates. Like forehead crests, these features vary widely within auklet populations.

The crested auklet is recognized primarily by two characteristics during the breeding season. The first is its crest, a group of bristle feathers located on top of its head above its eyes. The second is a social odor that the auklets produce during the breeding season, described as smelling like tangerines. This odor originates from tiny wick feathers, located in a small patch of skin between the shoulder blades. In winter plumage, their bills are smaller and dull yellow. They lack accessory plates and their crest and auricular plumes are reduced.

Juveniles are similar to winter adults, but without auricular and crest plumes. Their bills are smaller, and colored a dull brownish yellow. Juveniles take 33 days to reach adult size.

== Distribution and habitat ==
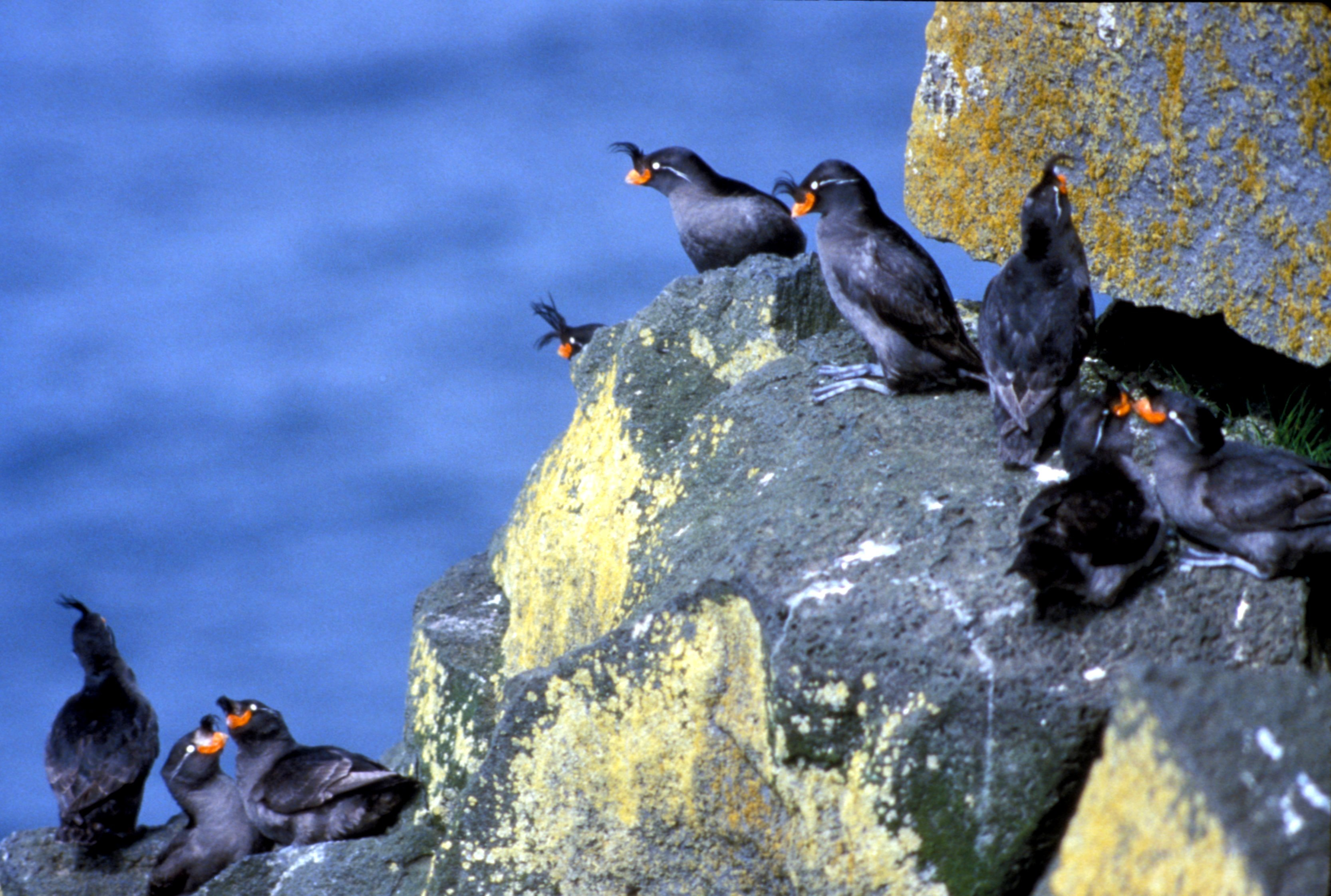
Crested auklets on a cliffside

Crested auklets are found throughout the northern Pacific Ocean and Bering Sea. They are particularly prevalent during the non-breeding winter months along the Aleutian Islands, Kuril Islands and the Russian island of Sakhalin. They travel to breeding locations on the islands and shorelines of the Sea of Okhotsk and the Bering Sea during the late spring and summer. Their habitats consist of slopes, boulder fields, lava flows, and sea cliffs. They are often found with other auklet species such as the least auklet. On a daily basis, crested auklets circle 500 meters above the sea and the breeding colonies. This circling is triggered by disturbances and predators posing a threat.

== Behavior and ecology ==
=== Diet ===
Crested auklets primarily forage in deep waters, however sometimes in areas closer to the shore, but always in large flocks. Little is known about the winter diets, however, it is suggested that they feed on a variety of marine invertebrates. Crested auklets are planktivores. Their diet consists mainly of krill, but they are also known to eat copepods, pteropods (such as Limacina), amphipods and larval fishes. Crested auklets dive from the surface of the water to catch their food. This behavior has been described as underwater "flight".

=== Breeding and parental care ===
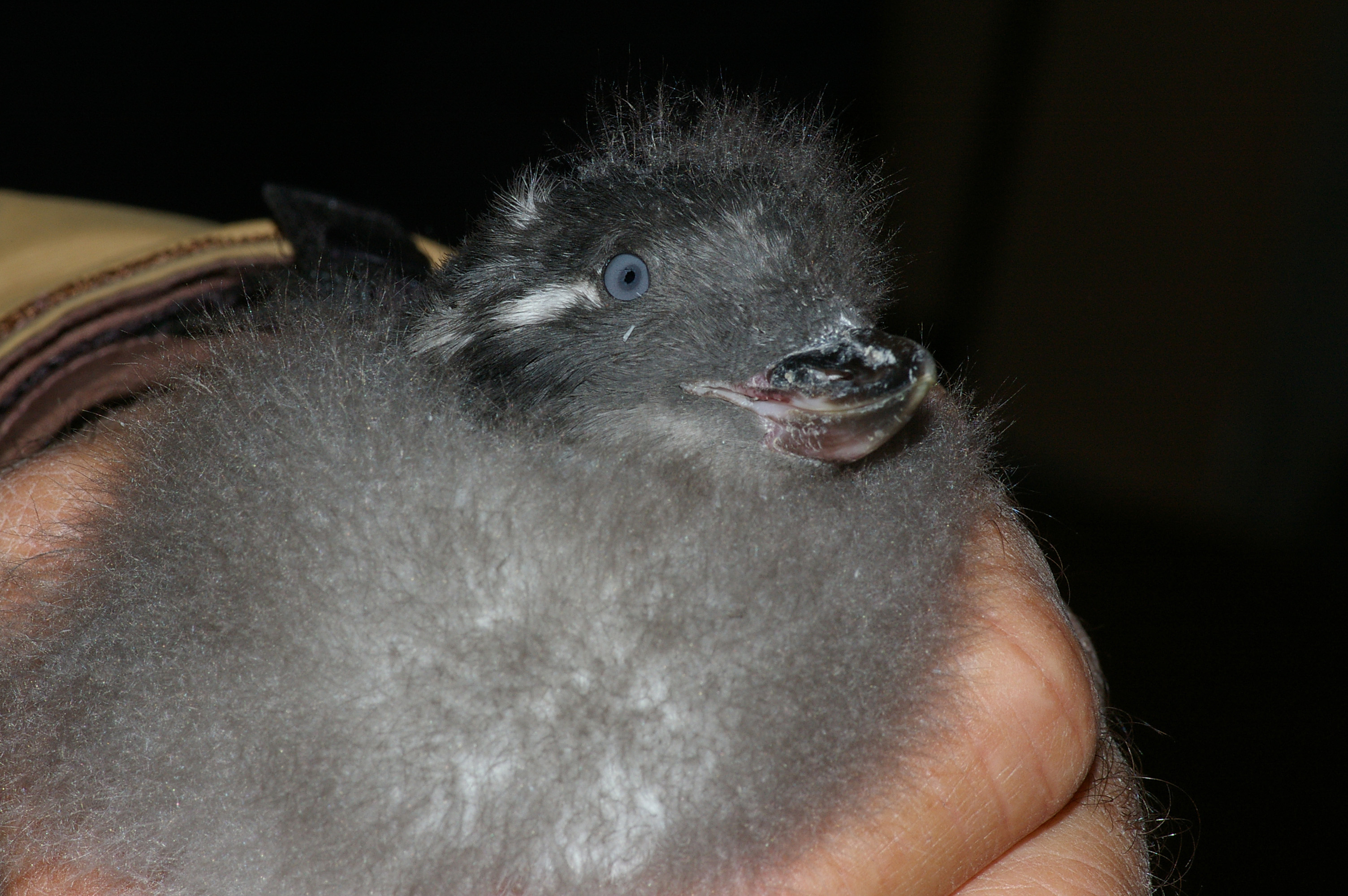
Chick in hand

The crested auklet breeding season begins mid-May and ends mid-August. Their nesting sites are within the rocky crevices of North Pacific coast. They breed in dense colonies of up to one million birds. Because of this, nesting sites are in close proximity, with as little as 0.3 meters between nests. Even so, there is a high degree of territoriality, and adults show a high degree of site fidelity within a year. Because mating occurs at sea and males have no copulatory organ, males must hover over females for a successful mating. Mate choice is mutual, but females do have final choice on breeding partner.

Crested auklets are highly social during the breeding season, before pair formation, and after pair formation. Within a breeding year, however, crested auklets are monogamous, with only 10% of the population having extra-pair copulations. Partners continue to self-advertise to other birds when they are not incubating. While some of this advertising behavior can be linked to extra-pair mating, it is suggested that continuation of the behavior allows birds to find pairs for the next breeding season. Only 45.5% of birds remain with the same partner in the subsequent breeding season.

Both sexes invest highly in parental care; parents share equally in incubating the single egg and raising the chick. Since both sexes are ornamented, crested auklets align with Robert Trivers's parental investment theory, which predicts that with biparental care, mutual choosiness will arise.

=== Sexual selection ===
Crested auklets are unique in their use of optical, vocal, and olfactory signals in mating. Their communicative behavior is more complex and diversified than that of closely related species. There are three general evolutionary mechanisms proposed to address the origin of the elaborate display traits of crested auklets, and of showy mating signals by males in general:

- Runaway selection: Fisher's theory of runaway sexual selection explains flamboyant traits in males as resulting from a genetic linkage between ornamental traits and a mating preference for such ornaments. Under this model, mating preferences could be spread by arbitrary or even deleterious traits that carry no benefits to fitness, besides sexual selection.
- The good genes hypothesis: The second mechanism is the good genes or handicap processes, where mating preference focuses on ornamental traits that reflect the health or viability of the individual expressing them. These good genes convey genetic benefits to the offspring. Amotz Zahavi proposed the handicap hypothesis, where he suggests that individuals' ornamental traits are indicators of good fitness, because they reflect the individual's success in spite of these traits as handicaps.
- Sensory exploitation: The third proposed mechanism is sexual selection for sensory exploitation, which results in mating preferences that arise due to natural selection for inherent sensory biases. Mutations occur that result in a display trait which exploits the pre-existing sensory bias.

=== Ornamentation ===
==== Visual ornaments ====
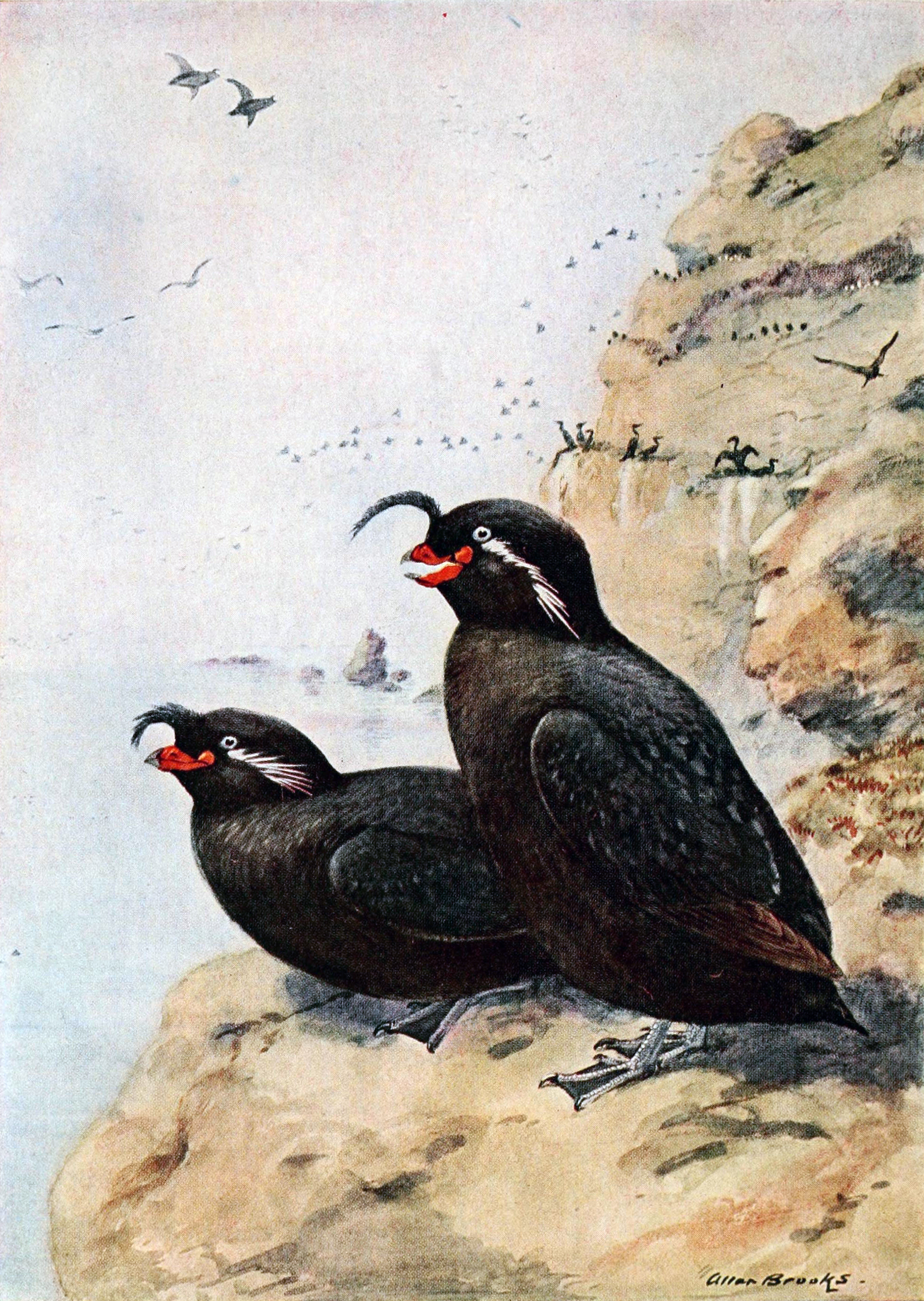
Illustration from 1913

Asserted dominance, with regards to claimed display area, has been correlated with crest length in both males and females. The existence of these showy monomorphic traits is indicative of intense sexual selection for both sexes. Large-crested adults of both sexes receive higher levels of sexual interest and displays from the opposite sex compared to those with smaller crests. Crested auklets with larger crests are more likely to obtain mates and to form pair bonds earlier.

Based on divorce rate and mortality, more than half of individuals find a new mate each year. Female crest length is the primary factor of male mate switching between years.

While there is variation in displays across populations, crested auklet crests and plume ornaments are consistent in expression within an individual over time. Furthermore, there is little sexual dimorphism or evidence of condition dependence. From studies, it seems to be a survival-neutral ornament. Some studies, however, offer up a functional purpose for these ornaments. One study suggests a link between habitat complexity and facial feathering, where tactile facial elongation helps individuals navigate complex underground crevices. The high density of crested auklet nesting sites can be expected to impose selective pressures on sensory mechanisms.

==== Vocal ornaments ====
Crested auklets have a wide variety of single and complex calls. Billing is "defined as pair courtship with mutual cackling vocal display." It is a crucial part of successful pair formation and becomes harmonious once male and female partners are well acquainted. Trumpet calls are one of the most common advertising calls. The call represents a complex but stereotyped vocal sequence that is linked with a specific visual display. Between individuals, the calls differ in duration and frequency. Calls are primarily performed in males, but can also be seen in females. The call is particularly strong in widowed females. These calls stay stable from year to year, and individuals' specific calls are associated with the maintenance of long-term social bonds between pair mates and between neighbors. This suggests that trumpet calls can be used for both short-term and long-term individual recognition. Recognition of neighboring individuals' calls is advantageous because it minimizes energy expenditure on aggressive displays, and prevents conflict between neighbors and trusted individuals (the "dear enemy phenomenon").

==== Olfactory ornaments ====
Crested auklets have a distinctive citrus-like plumage odor. The scent is released when there is ruffling of feathers on the nape and upper back of the individual from threat, trumpeting, or billing displays. The cloud of scent released encourages the ruff sniff display. A ruff sniff display is when birds fully insert their half open bill into the other's plumage. This display occurs in the absence of obvious aggression and is important for pair formation. For both sexes, a strong odor attracts more individuals, which then do a ruff sniff display.

Odor secretions increase during the breeding season, highlighting its association with courtship and mate selection. The scent may also act as an ectoparasite repellent. This scent is also found in whiskered auklet.

== Conservation status ==
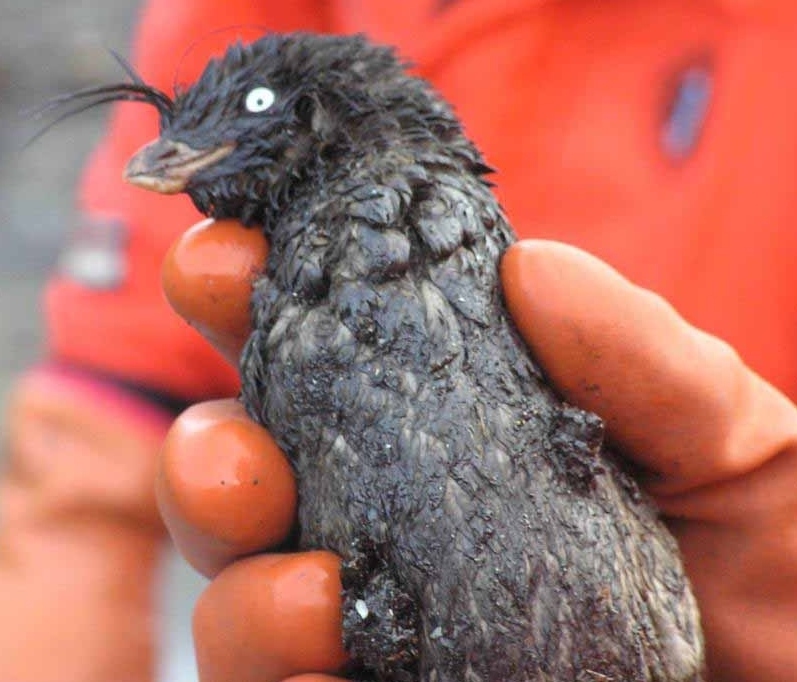
Specimen covered in oil after the MV Selendang Ayu oil spill

According to the International Union for Conservation of Nature, crested auklets are of least concern. The global population exceeds 8.2 million individuals, while the North American population is estimated at 2.9 million birds. However, an accurate assessment of the number of birds is difficult, since those on the surface of the colony and in the nearby sea form only a small proportion of the variable and poorly understood population.

There is greater concern for the Alaskan population. There has been high predation by rats which have escaped from fishing vessels in the harbor. The auklets' main predators are gulls, Arctic fox and common ravens. They have also been reported in the stomachs of halibut caught on St. Lawrence Island. Oil spills and collisions with light sources pose additional risks. In Alaska, there is some subsistence hunting of the species.

== Bibliography ==
=== Books ===
- Alderfer, Jonathan; Dunn, Jon L (2011) Field Guide to the Birds of North America, (6th edition) National Geographic Society. ISBN 0-7922-6877-6
- Harrison, Peter (1983) Seabirds, an Identification Guide, Houghton Mifflin, ISBN 0-395-33253-2
- del Hoyo, Josep (1996) Handbook of the Birds of the World: Hoatzin to Auks Vol 3, Lynx. ISBN 84-87334-20-2
- Sibley, David Allen (2000) The Sibley Guide to Birds, National Audubon Society. ISBN 0-679-45122-6

=== Websites ===
- "Aethia cristatella". Integrated Taxonomic Information System.
- Aethia cristatella - Avibase
