= Dow's puffin =

Dow's puffin Temporal range: Pleistocene - Holocene, 0.046–0.012 Ma
- Life restoration based on fossils and related species

Scientific classification
- Kingdom: Animalia
- Phylum: Chordata
- Class: Aves
- Order: Charadriiformes
- Family: Alcidae
- Genus: Fratercula
- Species: †F. dowi

Binomial name
- †Fratercula dowi Guthrie, Thomas & Kennedy, 2000

Extinct species of bird

Dow's puffin (Fratercula dowi) is an extinct seabird in the auk family described in 2000 from subfossil remains found in the Channel Islands of California. It was approximately as large as the modern horned puffin and its beak appeared to have been an intermediate between the rhinoceros auklet and the horned puffin. It lived during the Late Pleistocene and Early Pleistocene on the Channel Islands, where it nested alongside the ancient murrelet, Cassin's auklet and Chendytes lawi.

== History and naming ==
The first remains of Fratercula dowi were discovered in late 1986 by G. L. Kennedy and D. R. Muhs. The subfossil, an articulated bird skeleton, was found in a Late Pleistocene eolianite outcrop on San Nicolas Island. This specimen was found lying on its belly with a bent neck and preserved beak tip. Most of the skull, alongside much of the legs and posterior torso had eroded away but a complete fossil egg was discovered nearby. Initial observations by paleornithologist Hildegarde Howard regarded this bird to be an alcid potentially related to the rhinoceros auklet. In addition to the San Nicolas specimen, a rich bonebed was discovered on the nearby San Miguel Island, which yielded over 6,000 alcid bones distinct from the rhinoceros auklet. In 2000, the specimen recovered on San Nicolas Island served as the holotype of the new species Fratercula dowi, with several specimens from San Miguel Island being used as paratypes. In addition to these newer remains, some bones previously assigned to the rhinoceros auklet were also found to have belonged to Fratercula dowi, extending its range to Santa Rosa Island and possibly even Anacapa Island. The remains from San Nicolas Island date to the Late Pleistocene, approximately 46,000 to 31,000 years BP, while those of San Miguel are younger, with the most recent dating to approximately 11,890 years BP. The oldest remains of puffins from the Channel Islands may suggest that the species first appeared 100,000 years BP.

The species is named after Ronald J. Dow, who had assisted Kennedy and Muhs to their trips to the Channel Islands.

== Description ==
Dow's Puffin is clearly distinguishable from all other extant and extinct puffins of the American west coast by the morphology of the beak, specifically how far it extends dorsally and ventrally. The beak shape is not as narrow as in the modern rhinoceros auklet, but lacking the pronounced expansion seen in the horned puffin. As this character may be variable among members of a single species, the diagnosis for Fratercula dowi was later amended in a Ph. D. dissertation. Neil Adam Smith described several anatomical traits of the humerus that more clearly distinguish the Channel Islands species from its modern relatives. The distal margin of the humeral head for instance is rounded, something otherwise observed in other auks, while in puffins this region is pointed. The olecranon projects in a fashion similar to Synthliboramphus while the ulna shows characters otherwise seen in the whiskered auklet and the extinct Cerorhinca aurorensis.

Fratercula dowi is smaller than the tufted puffin, but indistinguishable in size from the rhinoceros auklet or the horned puffin. However Fratercula dowi appears to have undergone an overall decrease in size throughout its temporal range, with the youngest remains having been found to be smaller than its oldest.

== Phylogeny ==
Phylogenetic analysis of the Fraterculini has recovered that Fratercula dowi was likely the basalmost species within the genus.

- - Charadriiformes
    - Great black-backed gull (Larus marinus)
    - - Great skua (Stercorarius skua)
      - Alcidae
        - Alcinae
        - Fraterculinae
          - - Cassin's auklet (Ptychoramphus aleuticus)
            - Aethia spp.
          - - Rhinoceros auklet (Cerorhinca monocerata)
            - - †Dow's Puffin (Fratercula dowi)
              - - Tufted puffin (Fratercula cirrhata)
                - - Horned puffin (Fratercula corniculata)
                  - Atlantic puffin (Fratercula arctica)

== Paleobiology ==
During the Late Pleistocene Fratercula dowi coexisted with at least one other species of puffin on San Miguel Island, the tufted puffin which is known from three subfossil bones. Other Pleistocene puffin remains were initially assigned to the rhinoceros auklet, but later found to have either belonged to Dow's puffin or at least to the Fratercula genus. Besides the tufted puffin, other seabirds found on the Channel Islands include the ancient murrelet and Cassin's auklet. Seeing as the remains of these birds were all preserved in sitting positions, it is hypothesized that they died when their nesting burrows caved in. This would suggest that the nesting habits of Dow's puffin are closer to that of the tufted puffin and rhinoceros auklet, while the horned puffin nests in rocky crevices. Typically modern puffins lay a single egg which is attended by both parents, a fact that corresponds well with the single egg discovered in association with the holotype of Fratercula dowi. The egg is also within the size range of modern puffin species, which extends to the eggs discovered on San Miguel Island, even if they lack direct association to skeletal material. The flightless seaduck Chendytes lawi also nested on the island of San Miguel alongside the aforementioned auk species.

Although modern puffins are generally restricted to more northern latitudes, only occasionally coming as far south as California in the winter, water temperatures during the Pleistocene were notably cooler than they are today. This would explain the presence of a breeding population of Fratercula dowi on the Channel Islands.
