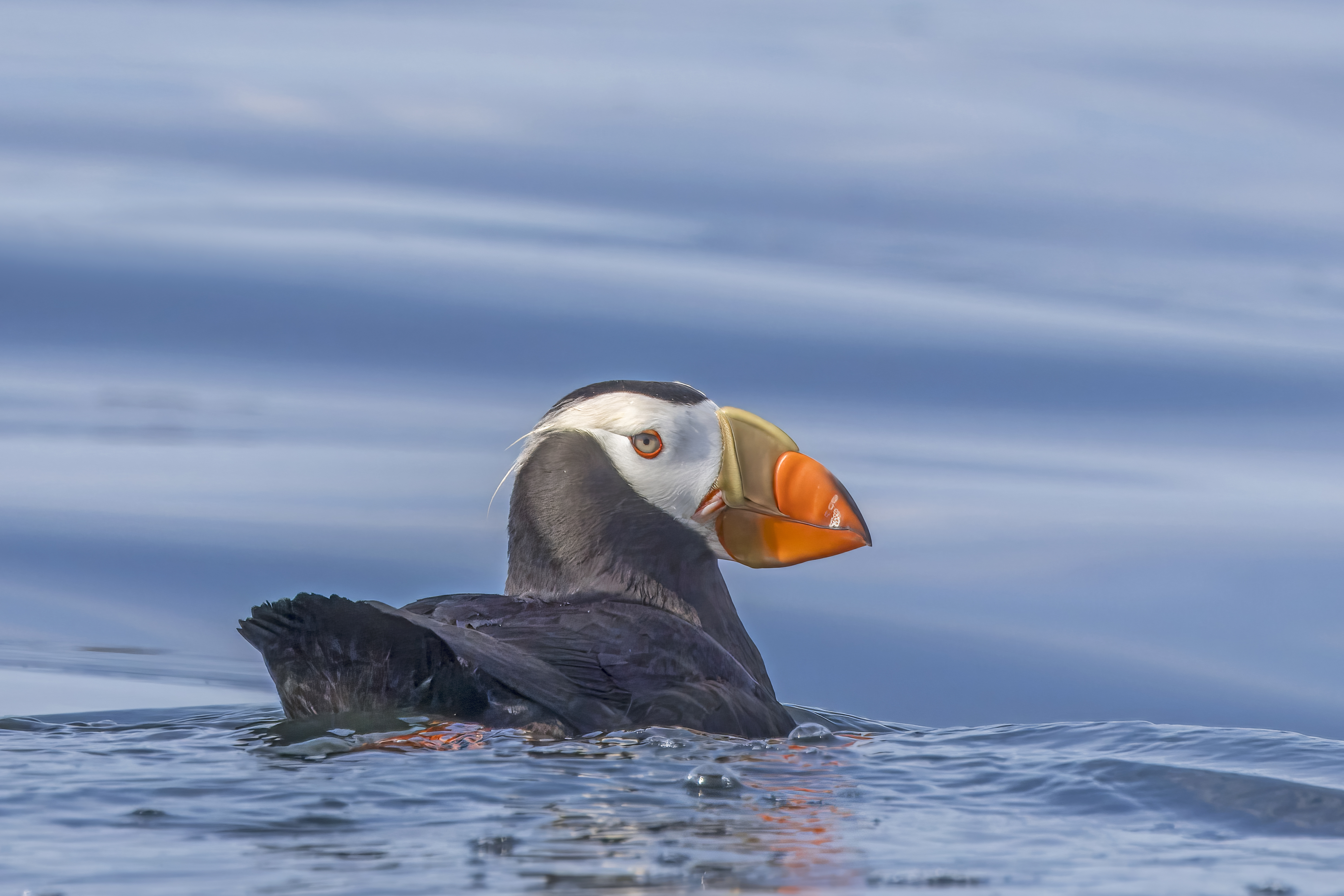
- off Tofino, British Columbia

Conservation status
- Least Concern (IUCN 3.1)

Scientific classification
- Kingdom: Animalia
- Phylum: Chordata
- Class: Aves
- Order: Charadriiformes
- Family: Alcidae
- Genus: Fratercula
- Species: F. cirrhata

Binomial name
- Fratercula cirrhata (Pallas, 1769)
- Distribution map of the tufted puffin extant (resident) extant (breeding visitor) extant (winter visitor)

Synonyms
- Alca cirrhata Pallas, 1769; Lunda cirrhata (Pallas, 1769); Sagmatorrhina lathami Bonaparte, 1851

= Tufted puffin =

Species of bird

The tufted puffin (Fratercula cirrhata), also known as crested puffin, is a relatively abundant medium-sized pelagic seabird in the auk family (Alcidae) found throughout the North Pacific Ocean. It is one of three species of puffin that make up the genus Fratercula and is easily recognizable by its thick red bill and yellow tufts.

== Description ==
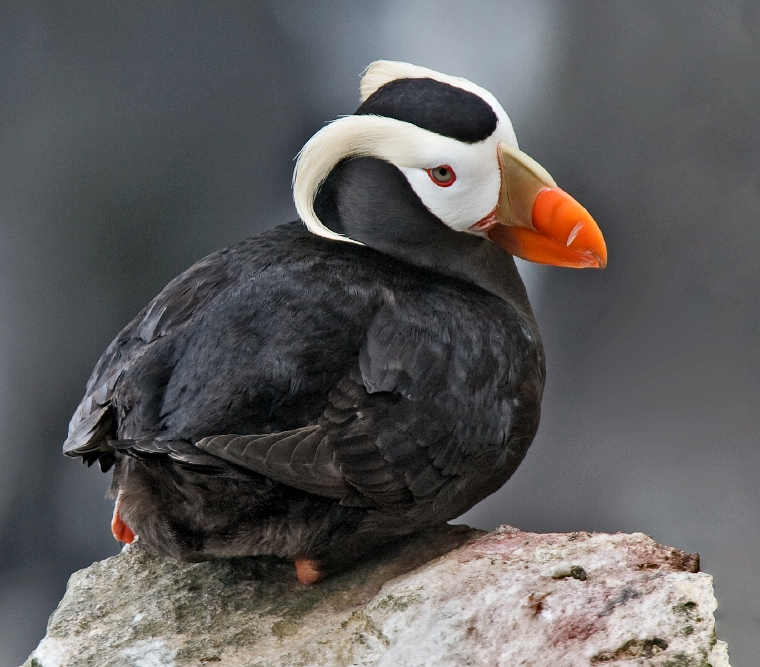
Breeding adult, St. Paul Island, Alaska

Tufted puffins are around 35 cm (14 in) in length with a similar wingspan and weigh about three-quarters of a kilogram (1.6 lbs), making them the largest of all the puffins. Birds from the western Pacific population are somewhat larger than those from the eastern Pacific, and male birds tend to be slightly larger than females.

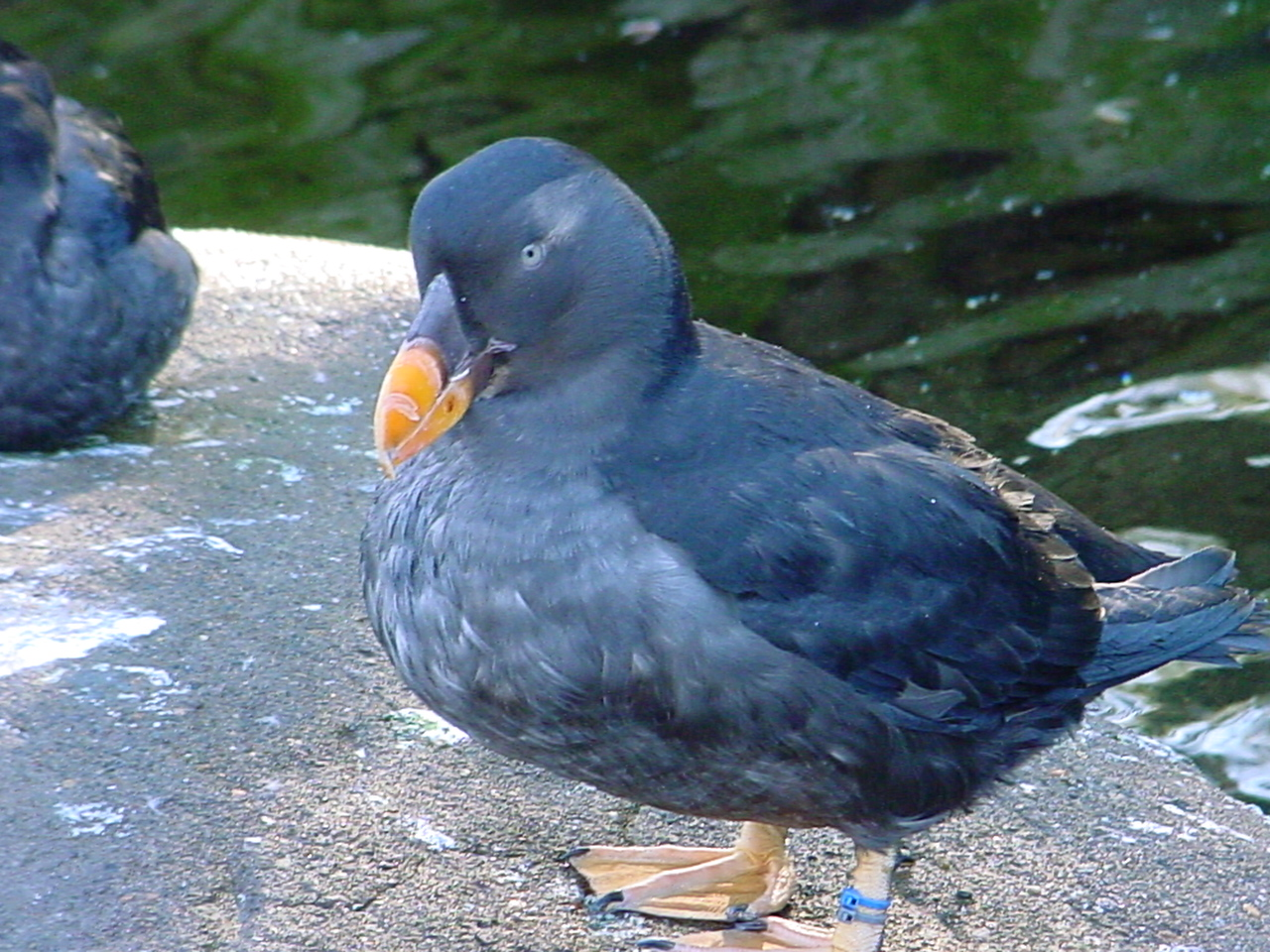
Adult in winter plumage

They are primarily black with a white facial patch, and, typical of other puffin species, feature a very thick bill, primarily red with some yellow and occasionally green markings. Their most distinctive feature and namesake are the yellow tufts (Latin: cirri) that appear annually on birds of both sexes as the summer reproductive season approaches. Their feet become bright red and their face is also bright white in the summer. During the feeding season, the tufts molt off and the plumage, beak, and legs lose much of their luster.

As among other alcids, the wings are relatively short, adapted for diving, underwater swimming, and capturing prey rather than gliding, of which they are incapable. As a consequence, they have thick, dark myoglobin-rich breast muscles adapted for a fast and aerobically strenuous wing-beat cadence, which they can nonetheless maintain for long periods of time.

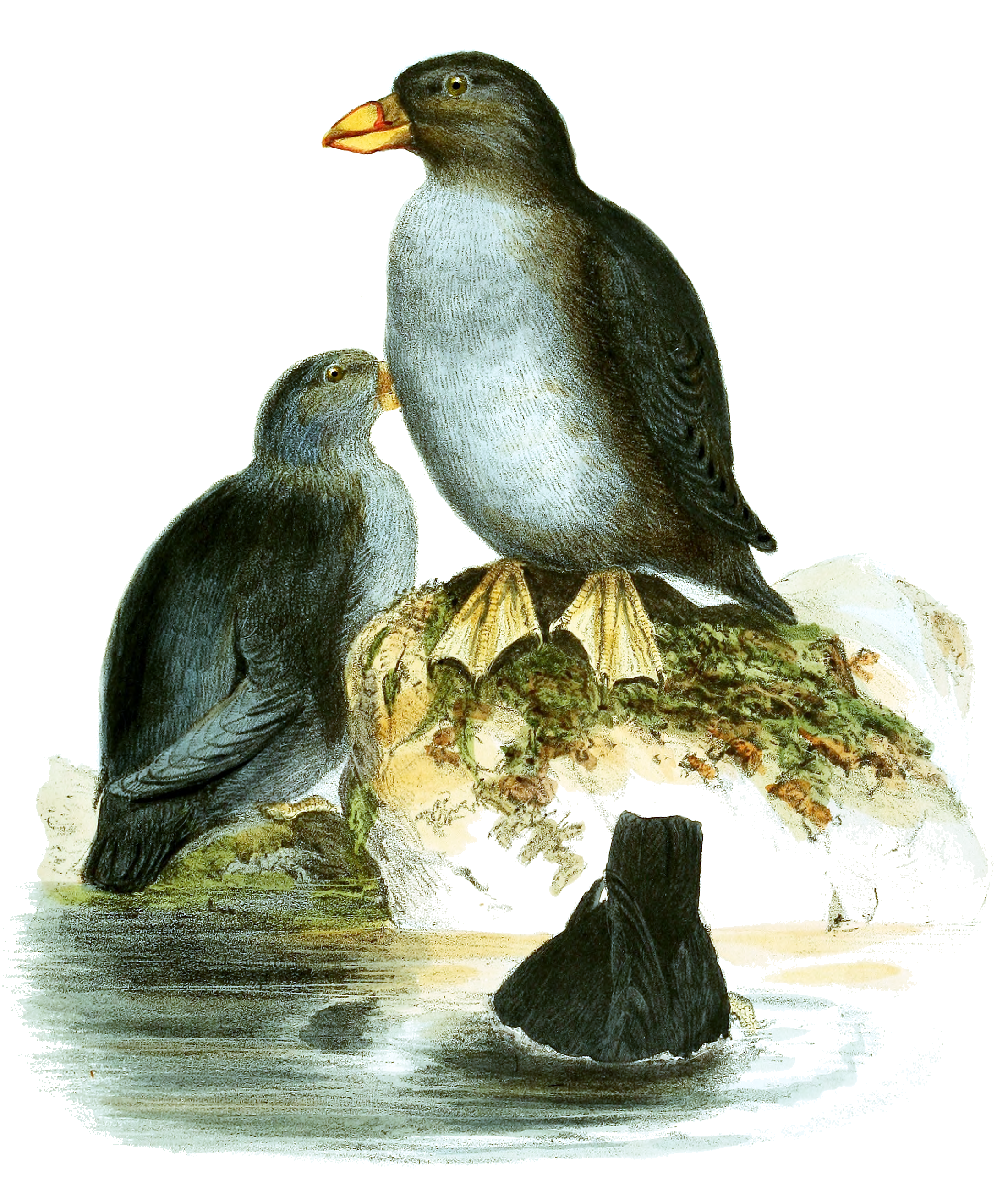
Juveniles

Juvenile tufted puffins resemble winter adults, but with a grey-brown breast shading to white on the belly, and a shallow, yellowish-brown bill. Overall, they resemble a horn-less and unmarked rhinoceros auklet (Cerorhinca monocerata).

Tufted puffins in Tokyo Sea Life Park

== Taxonomy ==
The tufted puffin was first described in 1769 by German zoologist Peter Simon Pallas. The scientific name Fratercula comes from the Medieval Latin fratercula, friar, a reference to the black and white plumage which resembles monastic robes. The specific name cirrhata is Latin for "curly-headed", from cirrus, a curl of hair. The vernacular name puffin – puffed in the sense of swollen – was originally applied to the fatty, salted meat of young birds of the unrelated species, the Manx shearwater (Puffinus puffinus), formerly known as the "Manks puffin". It is an Anglo-Norman word (Middle English pophyn or poffin) used for the cured carcasses. The Atlantic puffin acquired the name at a much later stage, possibly because of its similar nesting habits, and it was formally applied to that species by Pennant in 1768. It was later extended to include the similar and related Pacific puffins.

Since it may be more closely related to the rhinoceros auklet than the other puffins, it is sometimes placed in the monotypic genus Lunda.

The juveniles, due to their similarity to C. monocerata, were initially mistaken for a distinct species of a monotypic genus, and named Sagmatorrhina lathami ("Latham's saddle-billed auk", from sagmata "saddle" and rhina "nose").

== Distribution and habitat ==
Tufted puffins form dense breeding colonies during the summer reproductive season from Washington state and British Columbia, throughout southeastern Alaska and the Aleutian Islands, Kamchatka, the Kuril Islands and throughout the Sea of Okhotsk. While they share some habitat with horned puffins (F. corniculata), the range of the tufted puffin is generally more eastern. They have been known to nest in small numbers as far south as the northern Channel Islands, off the coast of southern California. However, the last confirmed sighting at the Channel Islands occurred in 1997.

Tufted puffins typically select islands or cliffs that are relatively inaccessible to predators, close to productive waters, and high enough that they can take to the air successfully. Ideal habitat is steep but with a relatively soft soil substrate and grass for the creation of burrows.

During the winter feeding season, they spend their time almost exclusively at sea, extending their range throughout the North Pacific and south to Japan and California.

== Behavior ==
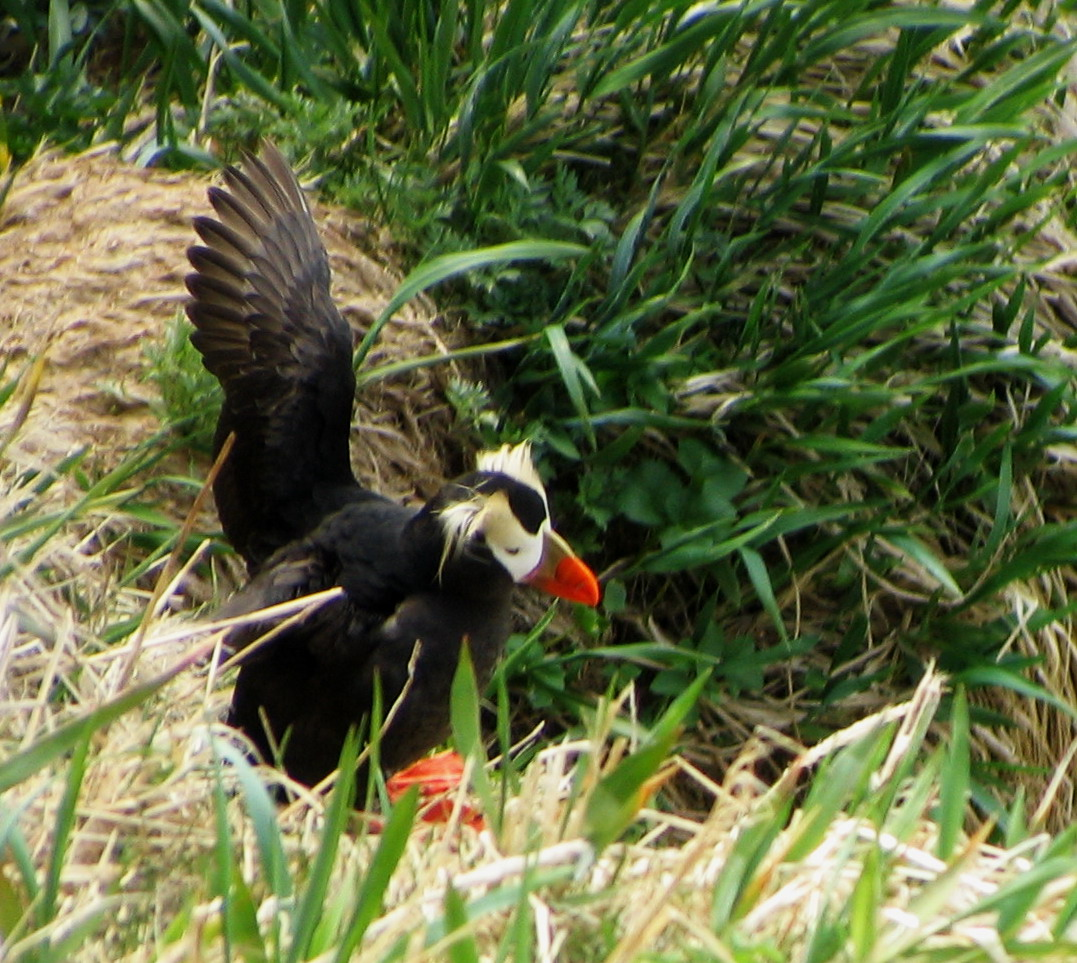
Adult outside nesting burrow on the Kuril Islands

=== Breeding ===
Breeding takes place on isolated islands: over 25,000 pairs have been recorded in a single colony off the coast of British Columbia. The nest is usually a simple burrow dug with the bill and feet, but sometimes a crevice between rocks is used instead. It is well-lined with vegetation and feathers. Courtship occurs through skypointing, strutting, and billing. A single egg is laid, usually in June, and incubated by both parents for about 45 days. The eggs are pure white or pale buff and are without gloss. They very often have barely perceptible shell markings of dull purplish color. Fledglings leave the nest at between 40 and 55 days.

Tufted puffins may be purely aquatic locomotive animals until they are three, living entirely as marine animals returning to shore only to breed on the nesting cliffs where they hatched. They tend to be well offshore when hatching.

=== Diet ===
Tufted puffins feed on a variety of fish and marine invertebrates, which they catch by diving from the surface. However, their diet varies greatly with age and location. Adult puffins largely depend on invertebrates, especially squid and krill. Nestlings at coastal colonies are fed primarily fish such as rockfish and sandlance, while nestlings at colonies closer to pelagic habitats are more dependent on invertebrates. Demersal fish are consumed in some quantity by most nestlings, suggesting that puffins feed to some extent on the ocean bottom.

Feeding areas can be located far offshore from the nesting areas. Puffins can store large quantities of small fish in their bills and carry them to their chicks.

=== Predators and threats ===
Tufted puffins are preyed upon by various avian raptors such as snowy owls, bald eagles and peregrine falcons, and mammals like the Arctic fox. Foxes seem to prefer the puffin over other birds, making the bird a main target. Choosing inaccessible cliffs and entirely mammal-free islands protects them from terrestrial predators while laying eggs in burrows is effective in protecting them from egg-scavengers like gulls and ravens.

A mass die-off of puffins at St. Paul Island, Alaska between October 2016 and January 2017 has been attributed to ecosystem changes resulting from climate change.

== Relationship with humans ==
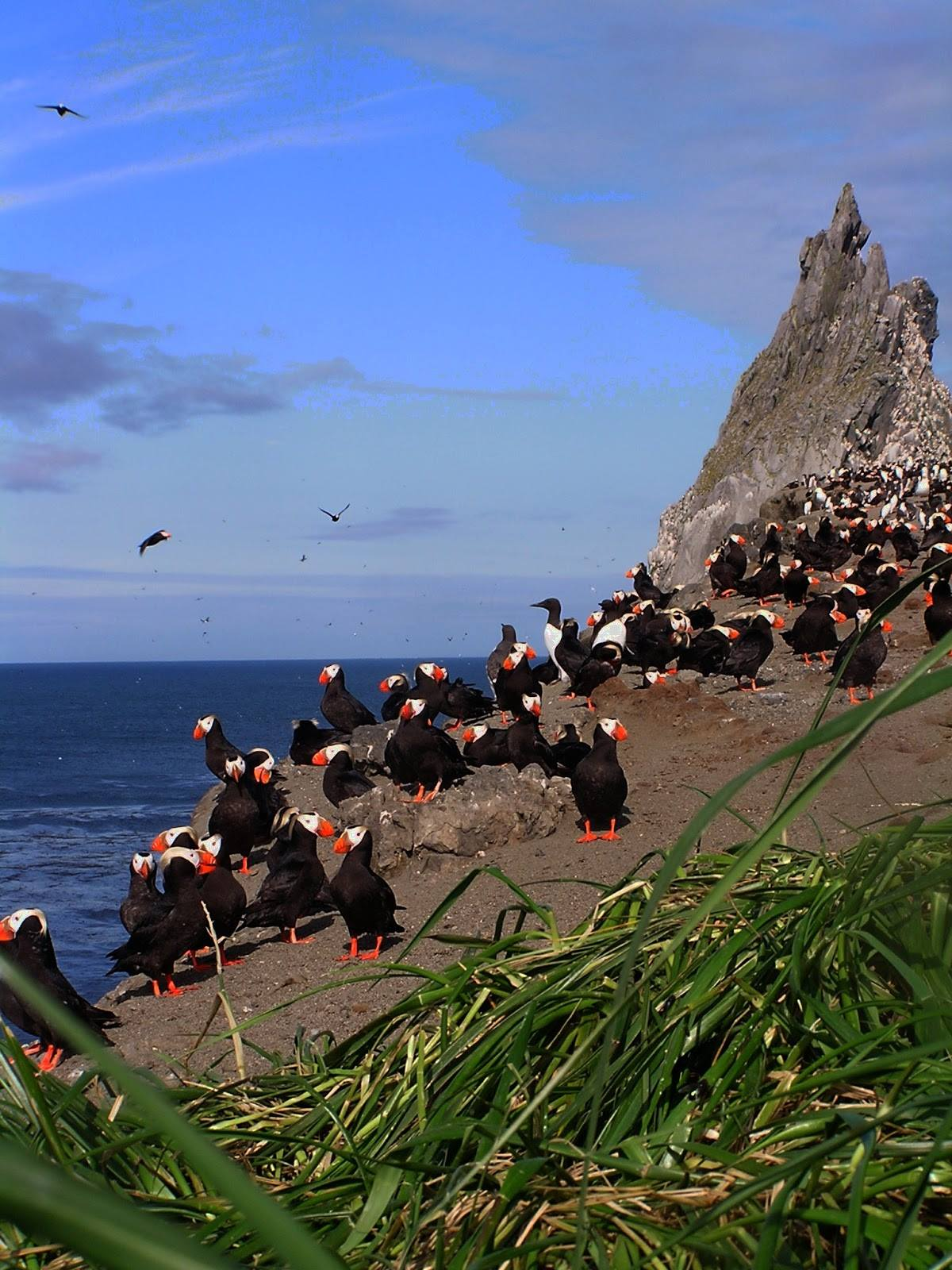
Group of tufted puffins, Bogoslof Island, Alaska

The Aleut and Ainu people (who called them Etupirka) of the North Pacific traditionally hunted tufted puffin for food and feathers. Skins were used to make tough parkas worn feather side in and the silky tufts were sewn into ornamental work. Currently, harvesting of tufted puffin is illegal or discouraged throughout its range.

The tufted puffin is a familiar bird on the coasts of the Russian Pacific coast, where it is known as toporok (Топорок) – meaning "small axe," a hint to the shape of the bill. Toporok is the namesake of one of its main breeding sites, Kamen Toporkov ("Tufted Puffin Rock") or Ostrov Toporkov ("Tufted Puffin Island"), an islet offshore Bering Island.

The oldest recorded tufted puffin was six years old when discovered in Alaska, the same state where it had been banded.

=== Conservation status in Puget Sound ===
Many rules and regulations have been set out to try to conserve fishes and shorebirds in Puget Sound. The Department of Natural Resources (DNR) of Washington State has created aquatic reserves surrounding Smith and Minor Islands. Over 36,000 acres (150 km^{2}) of tidelands and seafloor habitat were included in the proposed aquatic reserve. Not only do these islands provide the necessary habitat for many seabirds such as tufted puffins and marine mammals, but this area also contains the largest kelp beds in all of Puget Sound. In addition, Protection Island reserve has also been off limits to the public to aid marine birds in breeding. Protection Island contains one of the last two nesting colonies of puffins in Puget Sound, and about 70% of the tufted puffin population nests on this island.
