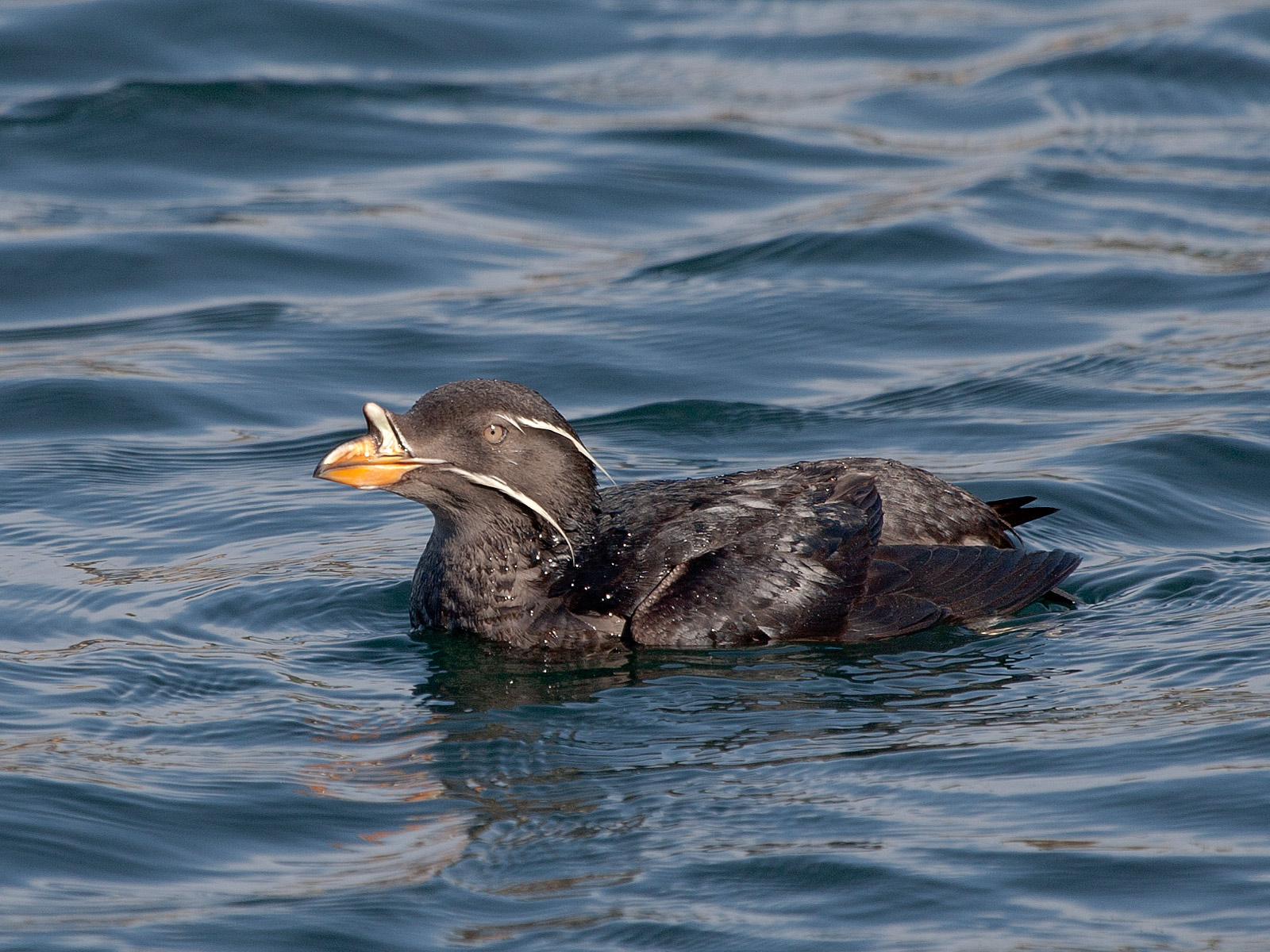
- Rhinoceros auklet (Cerorhinca monocerata)

Scientific classification
- Kingdom: Animalia
- Phylum: Chordata
- Class: Aves
- Order: Charadriiformes
- Family: Alcidae
- Genus: Cerorhinca; Bonaparte, 1828

Species
- Cerorhinca monocerata; †Cerorhinca dubia; †Cerorhinca minor; †Cerorhinca reai; †Cerorhinca sp. (North Carolina)

= Cerorhinca =

Cerorhinca Temporal range: Late Miocene - Recent

Genus of bird

Cerorhinca is a genus of auk containing the rhinoceros auklet and several fossil species.

== Evolutionary history ==
The genus Cerorhinca evolved in the North Pacific, apparently in the mid-late Miocene. Although today only one species remains, it used to be much more diverse, both in number of species and in distribution. Fossils have been found as far south as Baja California. While previously only known from the Pacific region, an unnamed species has been discovered from the Pliocene of North Carolina, the first record of the clade from the Atlantic Ocean. This suggests that the genus had a much wider distribution in the past, and a more complex biogeographic history than previously thought. Known prehistoric species are:

- Dubious auklet, Cerorhinca dubia L. H. Miller, 1925 (Late Miocene of San Barbara County, USA)
- Cerorhinca minor Howard, 1971 (Late Miocene/Early Pliocene of Cedros Island, Mexico)
- Cerorhinca reai Chandler, 1990 (San Diego Late Pliocene, North American Southwest)
- Cerorhinca aurorensis N. A. Smith, 2011, a nomen nudum, only published in a PhD dissertation (Yorktown Formation Late Pliocene, North Carolina, USA)
- Cerorhinca sp. (Early Pliocene, Southeastern Woodlands)
