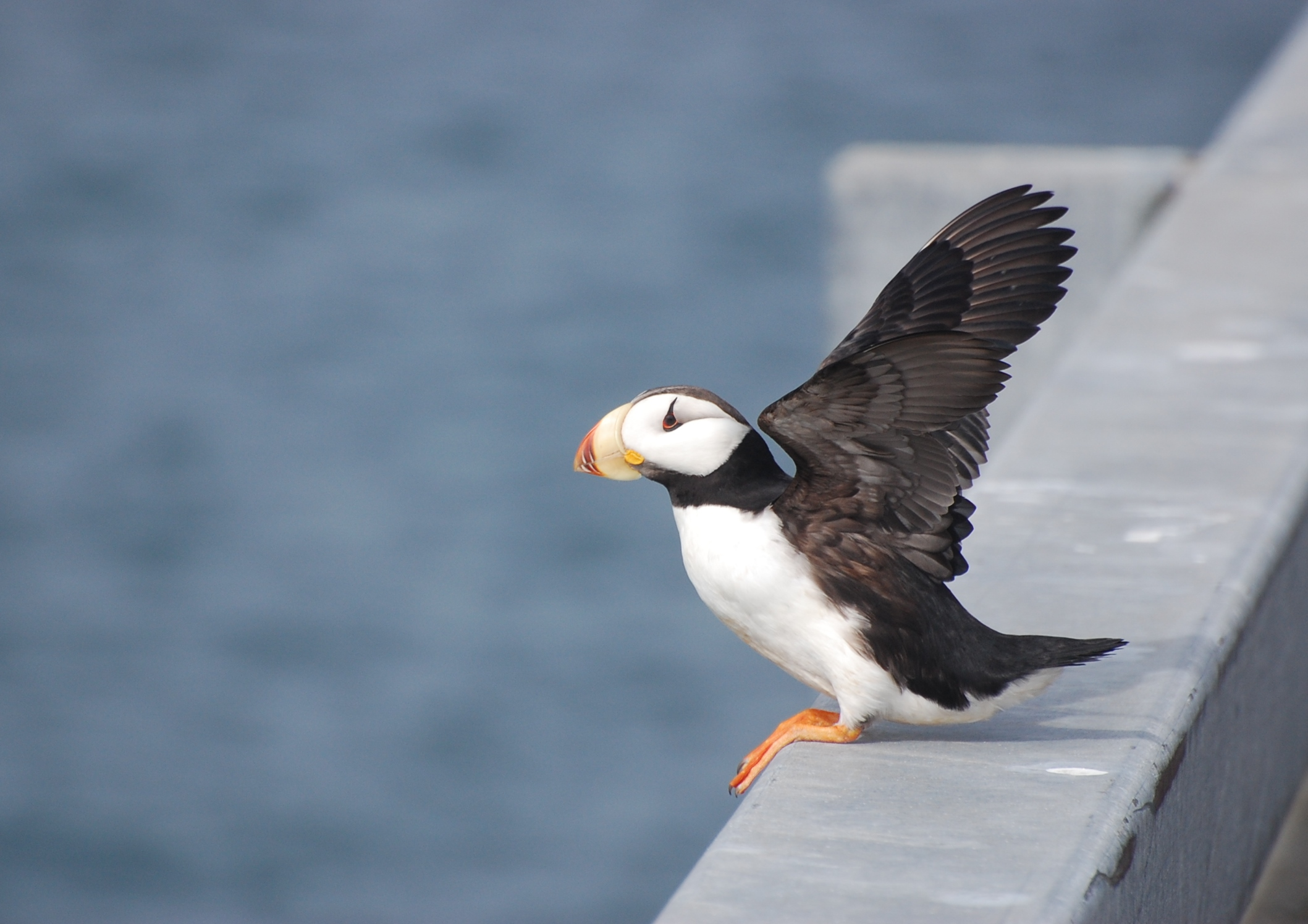

Conservation status
- Least Concern (IUCN 3.1)

Scientific classification
- Kingdom: Animalia
- Phylum: Chordata
- Class: Aves
- Order: Charadriiformes
- Family: Alcidae
- Genus: Fratercula
- Species: F. corniculata

Binomial name
- Fratercula corniculata (Naumann, JF, 1821)
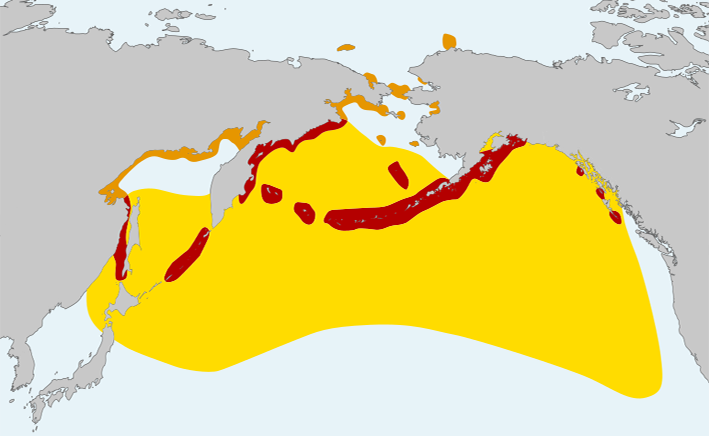
- Resident Breeding visitor Winter visitor

= Horned puffin =

Species of bird

The horned puffin (Fratercula corniculata) is an auk found in the North Pacific Ocean, including the coasts of Alaska, Siberia and British Columbia. It is a pelagic seabird that feeds primarily by diving for fish. It nests in colonies, often with other auks.

It is similar in appearance to the Atlantic puffin, its closest relative of the North Atlantic, but differs by a "horn" of black skin located above the eye, present in adult birds.

== Etymology ==
The binomial name of this species, Fratercula corniculata, comes from the Medieval Latin fratercula, meaning "friar"; their black-and-white plumage resembling the robes of monks. Corniculata means "horn-shaped" or "crescent-shaped", in reference to the black horn above the bird's eye.

The vernacular name puffin – puffed in the sense of swollen – was originally applied to the fatty, salted meat of young birds of the unrelated species, the Manx shearwater (Puffinus puffinus), formerly known as the "Manks puffin". It is an Anglo-Norman word (Middle English pophyn or poffin) used for the cured carcasses. The Atlantic puffin acquired the name at a much later stage, possibly because of its similar nesting habits, and it was formally applied to that species by Pennant in 1768. It was later extended to include the similar and related Pacific puffins.

The Yup'ik of the Yukon–Kuskokwim Delta call the puffin "qilangaq", "qengacuar(aq)" ("little nose"), or "qategarpak" ("large white breast"). The Ainu people of Sakhalin call them etupirka, which means "beautiful beak".

== Description ==
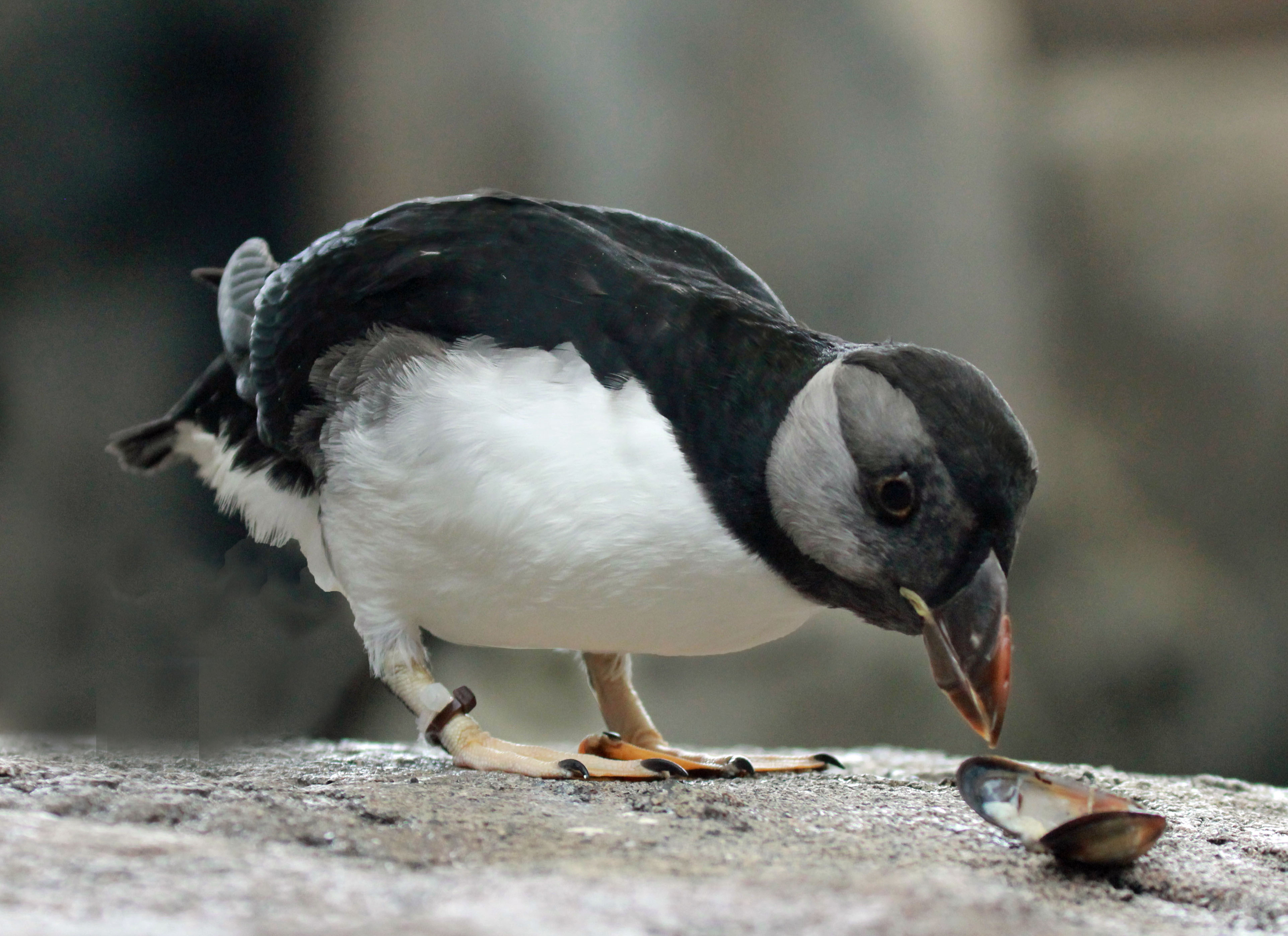
This juvenile lacks the horn and brilliantly colored rhamphotheca seen in sexually mature birds during the breeding season

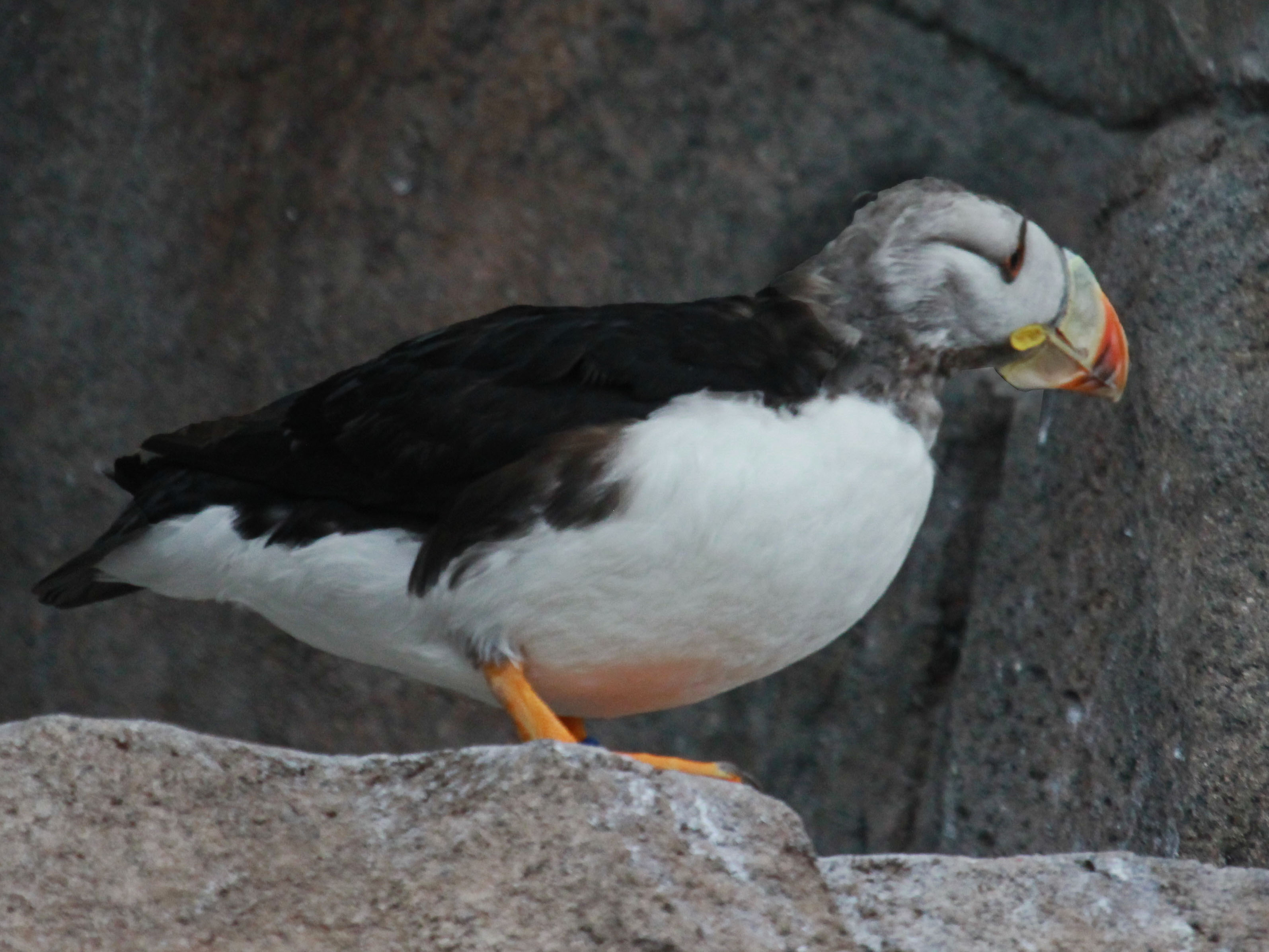
Horned puffin in eclipse plumage.

The height of the adult puffin is approximately 20 cm (8 in), the weight is approximately 500 g (18 oz), and the wingspan is approximately 58 cm (23 in). Horned puffins are monomorphic (the male and female exhibit the same plumage coloration). Sexually mature birds have a small fleshy black "horn" extending upwards from the eye, from which the animal derives its common name — the horned puffin. A dark eyestripe extends backwards from the eye towards the occiput. The cheeks are white, with a yellow wattle at the base of the bill. The legs and feet are orange.

The horned puffin's bill, which is larger than those of other puffin species, is red at the tip and yellow at the base. In summer (breeding) plumage, the bill's outer layer – the rhamphotheca – grows in size and turns bright yellow with a dark orange tip. The size and color of the rhamphotheca helps to attract a mate. The brilliant outer layers of the rhamphotheca are shed in late summer, as the face reverts to a gray and black color, and the legs and feet fade to a pale fleshy color. This phase is referred to as eclipse plumage. The puffin's bill has fluorescent properties that are also used to attract a partner. Puffins can see ultraviolet rays, allowing them to spot luminescence on the bills of other puffins during the courtship display.

The horned puffin chick has smoky-gray cheeks and a fine, black triangular-shaped beak. The feet are pinkish or greyish. The juvenile's height is less than that of the adult at the time of leaving the nest. Young puffins lose their greyish facial spots during their first springtime. The beak gains its developed form at the age of one year and continues to grow over the years, reaching the brightest coloration at five years, the point of sexual maturity. The puffin reaches its adult size and weight at this period.

== Call ==
Horned puffins emit a relatively small number of sounds, mostly low in volume. These guttural noises are identified as cooing, roaring or grunting. The most common puffin sound is usually transcribed as "arr-arr-arr", which accelerates when the animal is threatened, becoming an "A-gaa-kah-kha-kha". These noises are most often produced by adults and are similar to bellowing, described as the "distant sound of a chainsaw".

The sounds during the mating season can be transcribed as "Op-op-op-op-op". These sounds are rarely made outside breeding times, and puffins are quieter at sea.

== Distribution and habitat ==
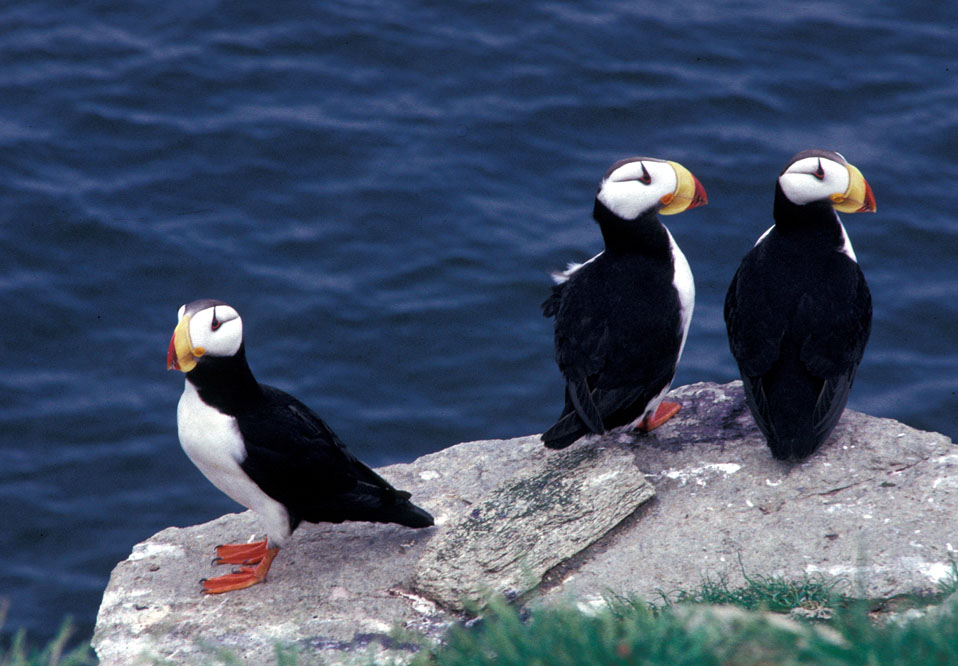
Three horned puffins on a cliff in Alaska.

The horned puffin is relatively common across its range. It is present throughout the northern Pacific Ocean, including the Shumagin Islands of the Bering Sea, the Siberian coast, Kamchatka, Sakhalin, and the Kuril Islands. In North America, it is found on the western coasts of Alaska and British Columbia, Haida Gwaii and the Aleutian Islands. Horned Puffin are also found in the vicinity of the Chukchi Sea and especially on Wrangel Island. More rarely, the species travels as far south as Japan and the coasts of Oregon and California. It is not a migratory bird, although it winters far out to sea.

Horned puffins live among steep rocky slopes and cliffs. Unlike other puffins, they dig little or no burrows, preferring rock crevices or shelters under piles of rock for home and shelter.

As of 2023, for the last several years, at least one Horned Puffin has been seen spending the summer months at Smith Island, Washington, in the Salish Sea, alongside the local breeding population of Tufted Puffins. Researchers, with help from several commercial Whale Watching companies in the region, are trying to figure out if this is a lone individual, or a potentially a mated pair. If it is the latter, this would add a breeding location for the species hundreds of miles away from their normal grounds.

== Behavior ==
=== Flight ===
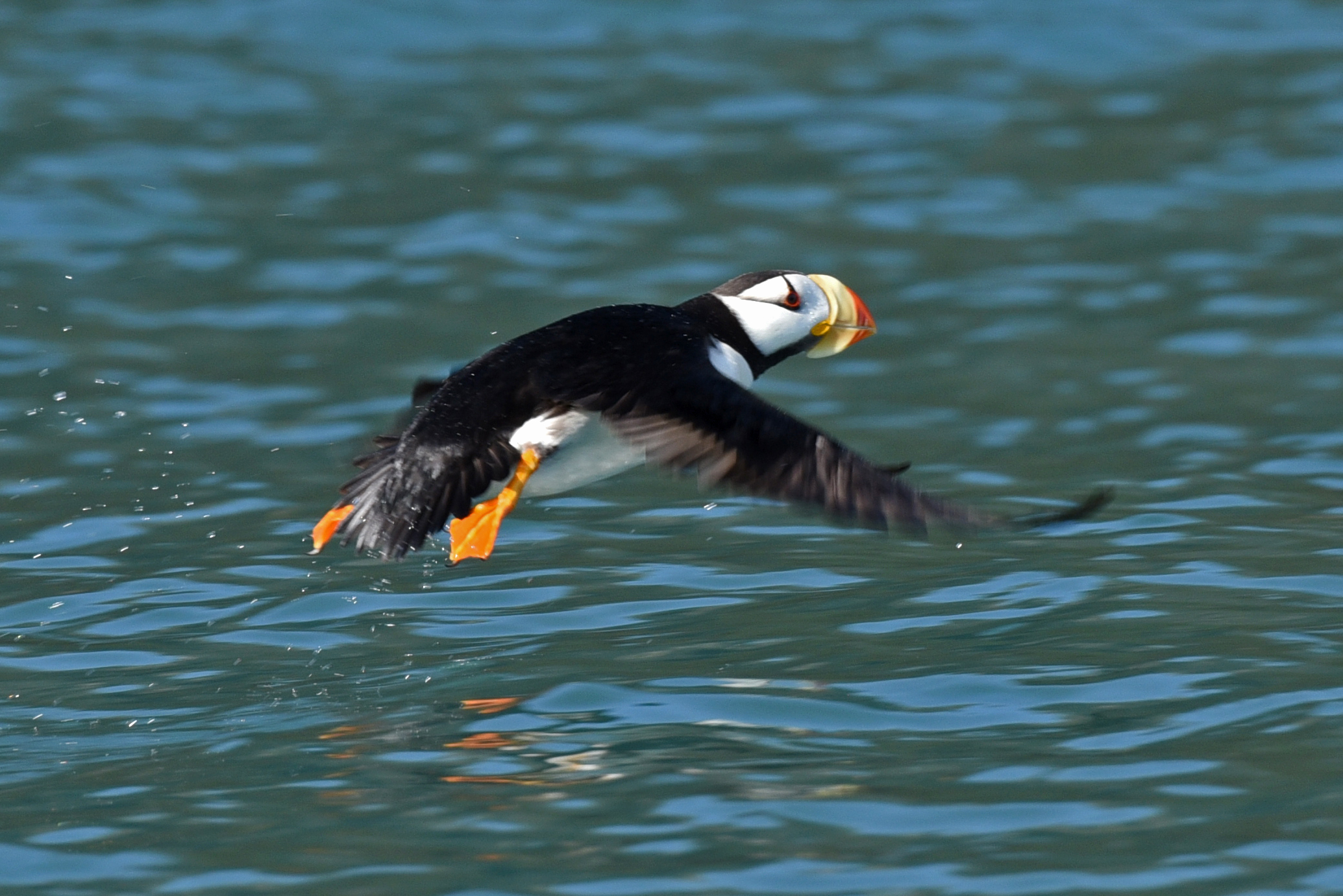
A horned puffin flying over the ocean

To achieve flight, horned puffins either jump off a cliff to gain momentum, or races across the water to reach the speed required for takeoff. Horned puffins fly compactly and quickly, 10 to 30 meters (33 to 98 ft) above sea level. The wing beats are constant, rapid and regular. They fly in groups of about two to fifteen individuals, traveling between nesting and foraging grounds, sometimes with tufted puffins or murres.

=== On land ===
The horned puffin walks upright, gripping rock surfaces with its claws, and climbs cliffs with ease. Its normal running position is made on low density soil, usually around a hole.

Horned puffins live and breed in colonies of tens to thousands or more. They fly in circular motions above the colony before landing, upon which they adopt a dominant or submissive posture towards other birds. The sign of submission is to briefly hold their legs slightly apart and spread their wings over their head for about four seconds. The puffin's dominant display is to holding its beak open with its tongue lowered (known as "gaping"), back feathers erect, stepping in place as it rocks from side to side. This gesture is often made towards a rival puffin, who may either back down or fight with the intruder. During fights, puffins lock bills and beat each other with their wings, and the two combatants may tumble down a slope or cliff still locked in battle.

=== At sea ===
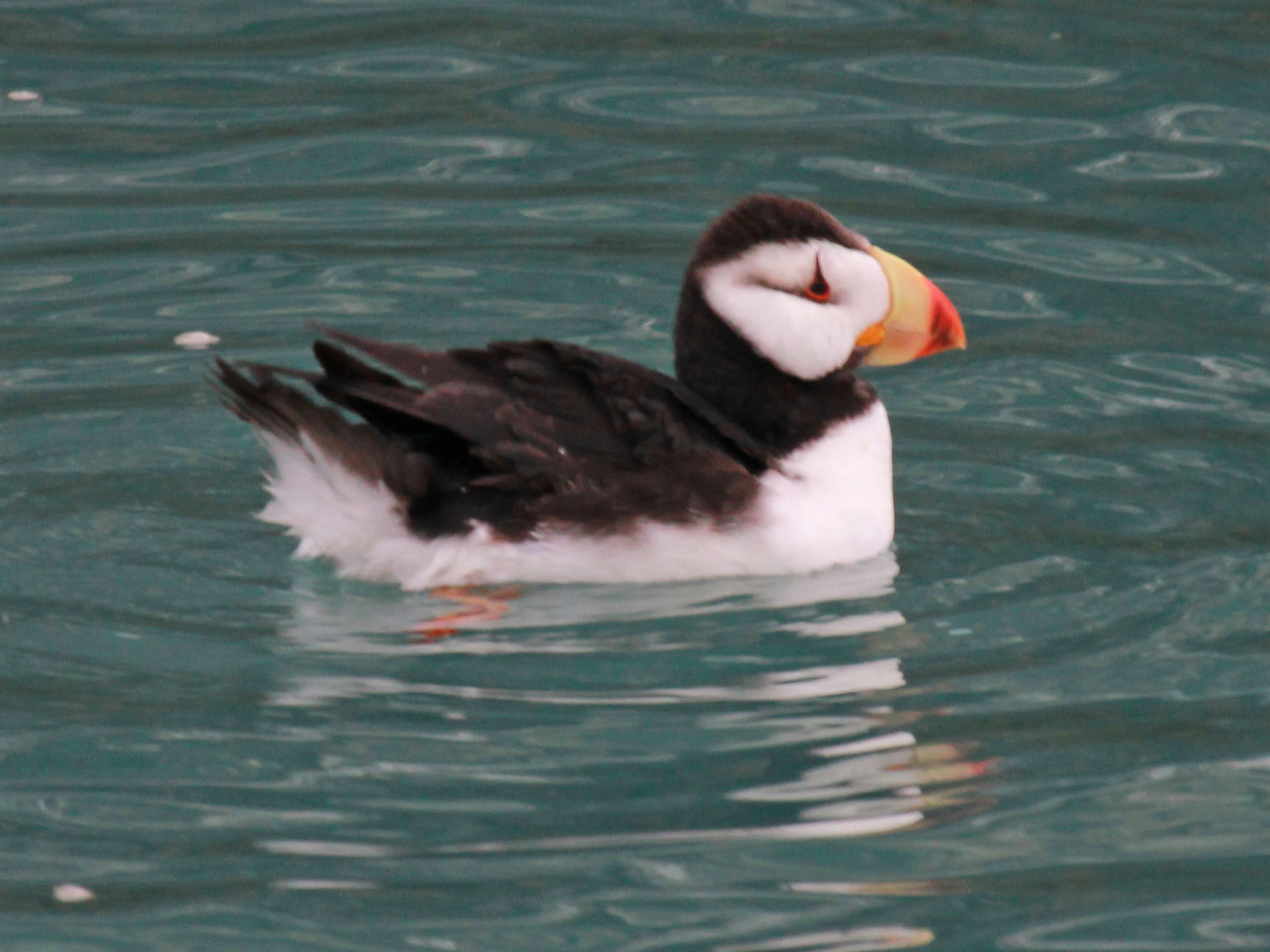
A horned puffin floating on the water's surface

Horned puffins spend half of their time on water, paddling along the surface with their feet. They are extremely agile underwater, to the point that their movement can be called "underwater flight" rather than swimming. Their powerful wings serve as oars and their webbed feet work as a rudder. Water pressure keeps the feathers glued to the body, placing the puffin into an aerodynamic shape. Puffins can easily stay longer than one minute under water.

Like most other seabirds, horned puffins have waterproof plumage, which permits it to dive and prevents rapid heat loss. This is made possible by its feather disposition and a specialized gland near the tail called the uropygial gland. This secretes a greasy and hydrophobic liquid that the puffin spreads on its plumage with its beak, permitting it to float.

=== Food and hunting techniques ===
Adult horned puffins are quite general in their diet, feeding on fish, small invertebrates, crustaceans, polychaete worms and squid. They also feed on small algae and marine plants.

To catch fish, horned puffins dive down to about 30 meters (98 ft), pursuing prey mostly taking place at 15 meters (49 ft) in depth. The puffin most commonly hunts in the early morning. It dives head first into water, as it stakes out a school of fish, and keeps an eye out for predators. Once the prey is spotted, the puffin dives in pursuit. Diving for prey usually lasts between 20 and 30 seconds. Puffins usually swallow several small fish before the bringing rest back to the colony. They do not take the time to readjust their prey within their beaks, so as not to risk losing their meal.

Hunting areas are usually located fairly far offshore from the nest. Horned puffins will return from hunting with several small fish, squid or crustaceans in their specialized bills. The chicks have a less varied diet, feeding mainly on sandeel or capelin from near the coast. These fish are distributed by the parents two to six times per day. Unlike many other seabirds, which employ regurgitation to feed their young, horned puffins feed their chicks whole fish directly from the bill. Both parents participate in the feeding and rearing of the chick.

=== Reproduction ===
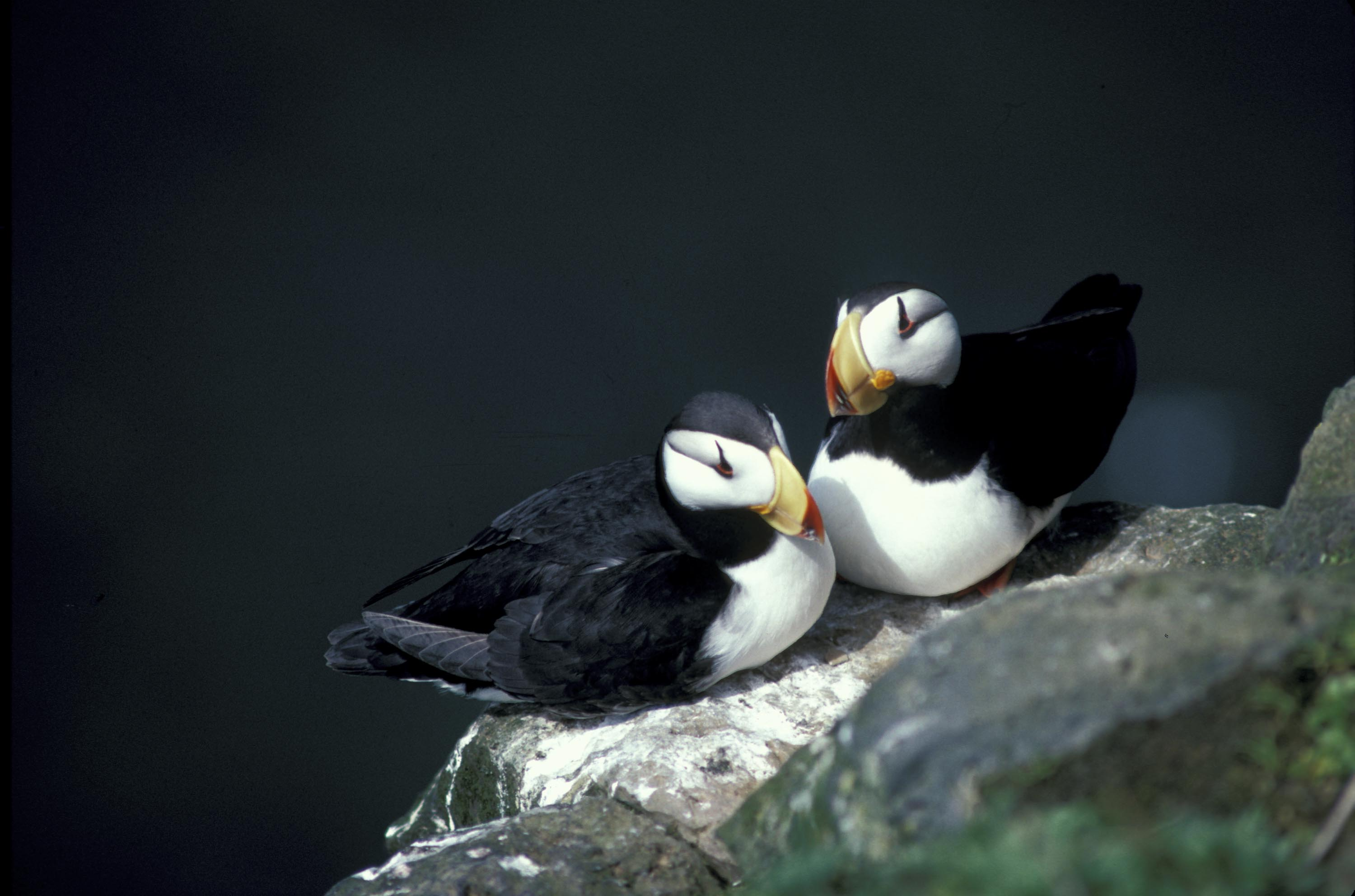
Horned puffin couple at Pribilof Islands

The horned puffin reaches sexual maturity between the age of five and seven years, entering the breeding season between May and September. Horned puffin pairs are monogamous. Courtship begins as the male and female puffin swim alongside on the water. The male displays by arising from the water, neck outstretched, opening and closing the bill while jerking the head. The female makes a hunched posture with her neck contracted inwards, close to the water surface. This is followed by billing, a practice where mated birds touch beaks. A slight head movement from both partners confirms that the couple will now mate for life. The male then mounts the female from behind, beating his wings to keep balance. After about 35 seconds of mating, the female proceeds to dive down and surface again. The pair then flap their wings.

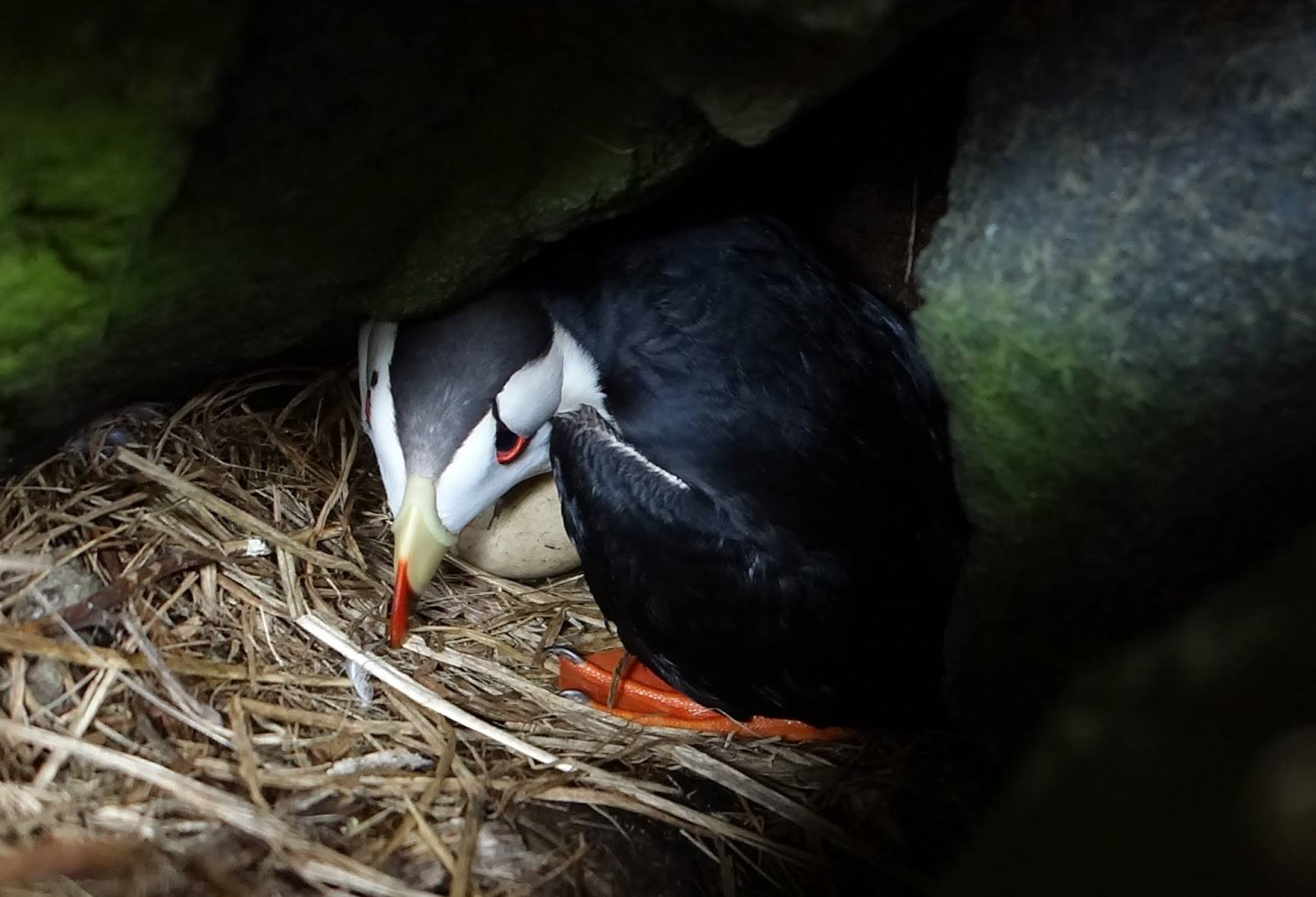
Nest with egg in a rock crevice, Aiktak Island, Alaska

Pairs choose a nesting ground a week after arriving at the breeding area, preferring rock crevices. They clear a space and gather materials to build their nest, mostly out of grass and feathers. Each pair lays only one egg per year. Pairs in the same colony usually lay around the same time, but very rarely this occurs over more than one week. The female's sperm storage glands in the oviduct help select spermatozoa during the race to the egg cell. The egg is oval, off-white in color with lavender, gray and brown highlights. Both parents take turns incubating the egg over about 41 days, and spend another forty days raising the chick. The fledgling leaves the nest alone and at night, making its way towards open water, then quickly dives and swims away to begin independent life.

Rises in ocean temperature have increased the reproductive rate of the horned puffin.

== Status ==
The total number of horned puffins is estimated at 1,200,000. 300,000 are located in Asia, while the other 900,000 are located in North America, with a high concentration in the Alaska Peninsula numbering 760,000. In Alaska, nearly 250,000 puffins are distributed in 608 different colonies, the largest being on Suklik Island. There are about 92,000 horned puffins in the Aleutian Islands, while nearly 300,000 are located on the islands and coasts of the Sea of Okhotsk. The Chukchi Sea has a colony of 18,000 puffins at sea level, the largest in the area.

== Bibliography ==
- "National Geographic", Field Guide to the Birds of North America, ISBN 0-7922-6877-6
- Seabirds, an Identification Guide by Peter Harrison, (1983), ISBN 0-7470-1410-8
- Handbook of the Birds of the World Vol 3, Josep del Hoyo (editor), ISBN 84-87334-20-2
- "National Audubon Society", The Sibley Guide to Birds, by David Allen Sibley, ISBN 0-679-45122-6
