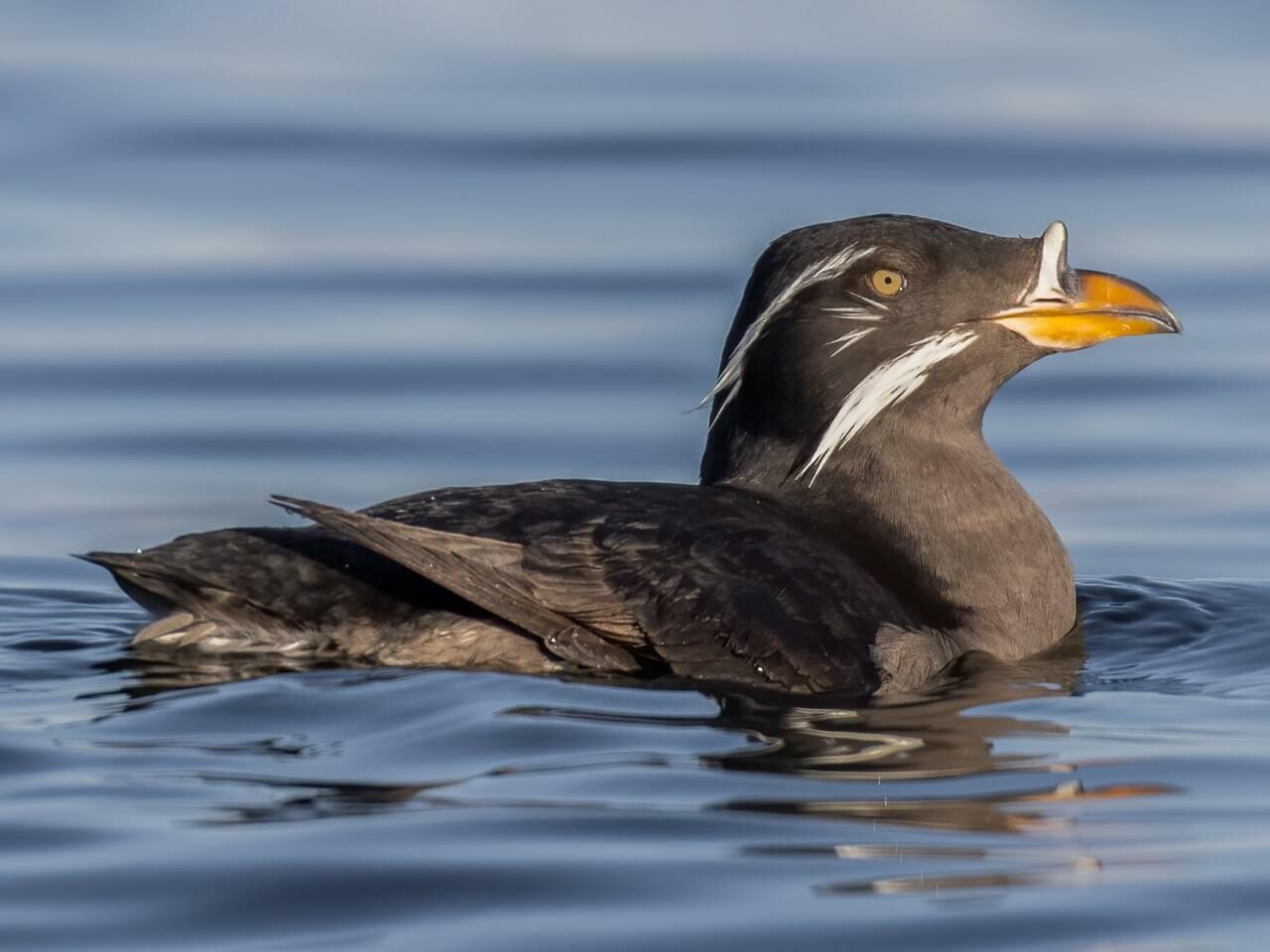
- in Alaska

Conservation status
- Least Concern (IUCN 3.1)

Scientific classification
- Kingdom: Animalia
- Phylum: Chordata
- Class: Aves
- Order: Charadriiformes
- Family: Alcidae
- Genus: Cerorhinca
- Species: C. monocerata

Binomial name
- Cerorhinca monocerata (Pallas, 1811)

= Rhinoceros auklet =

Species of seabird related to puffins

The rhinoceros auklet (Cerorhinca monocerata) is a seabird and a close relative of the puffins. It is the only extant species of the genus Cerorhinca. Given its close relationship with the puffins, the common name rhinoceros puffin has been proposed for the species.

It ranges widely across the North Pacific, feeding on small fish and nesting in colonies. Its name is derived from a horn-like extension of the beak (the anatomic term for this extension is the rhamphotheca). This horn is only present in breeding adults, and like the elaborate sheath on the bill of puffins is shed every year. This horn also possesses fluorescent properties, which is likely involved in reproductive signalling.

The rhinoceros auklet (also known as the rhino auklet, horn-billed puffin, or unicorn puffin), is a medium-sized auk with a large, strong, orange/brown bill (with the 'horn' protruding from it). The plumage is dark on top and paler below; breeding adults (both male and female) possess white plumes above the eyes and behind the bill. Males are slightly larger than females (about 10% in mass).

== Distribution ==
The rhinoceros auklet is a North Pacific auk that breeds from California (the Channel Islands) to the Aleutian Islands in Alaska in North America; and Hokkaidō and Honshū, Japan, as well as the Korean Peninsula and Sakhalin Island in Asia. It winters both in offshore and inshore waters, exhibiting some migration. Between October and April, migration of a large number occurs on pelagic California waters, most coming from breeding colonies north of California. Auks that reside off the California coast remain in their areas.

== Biology ==
Since rhinoceros auklets are monogamous and highly social, the species depend heavily on physical characteristics of the other species in order to choose a lifetime mate. The prominent horn on the bill of breeding rhinoceros auklet is one evolutionary byproduct of this behavior. The bill has fluorescent characteristics when viewed under ultraviolet light. Several bird species are able to detect cues through UV light, which supports the claim that this fluorescence is also meant for breeding purposes. While the upper and lower mandible give off fluorescence as well, this phenomenon is most prominent in the horn. There is no evidence for disparity of fluorescence between sexes, however, the amount of fluorescence does vary between individual auks.

=== Reproduction ===
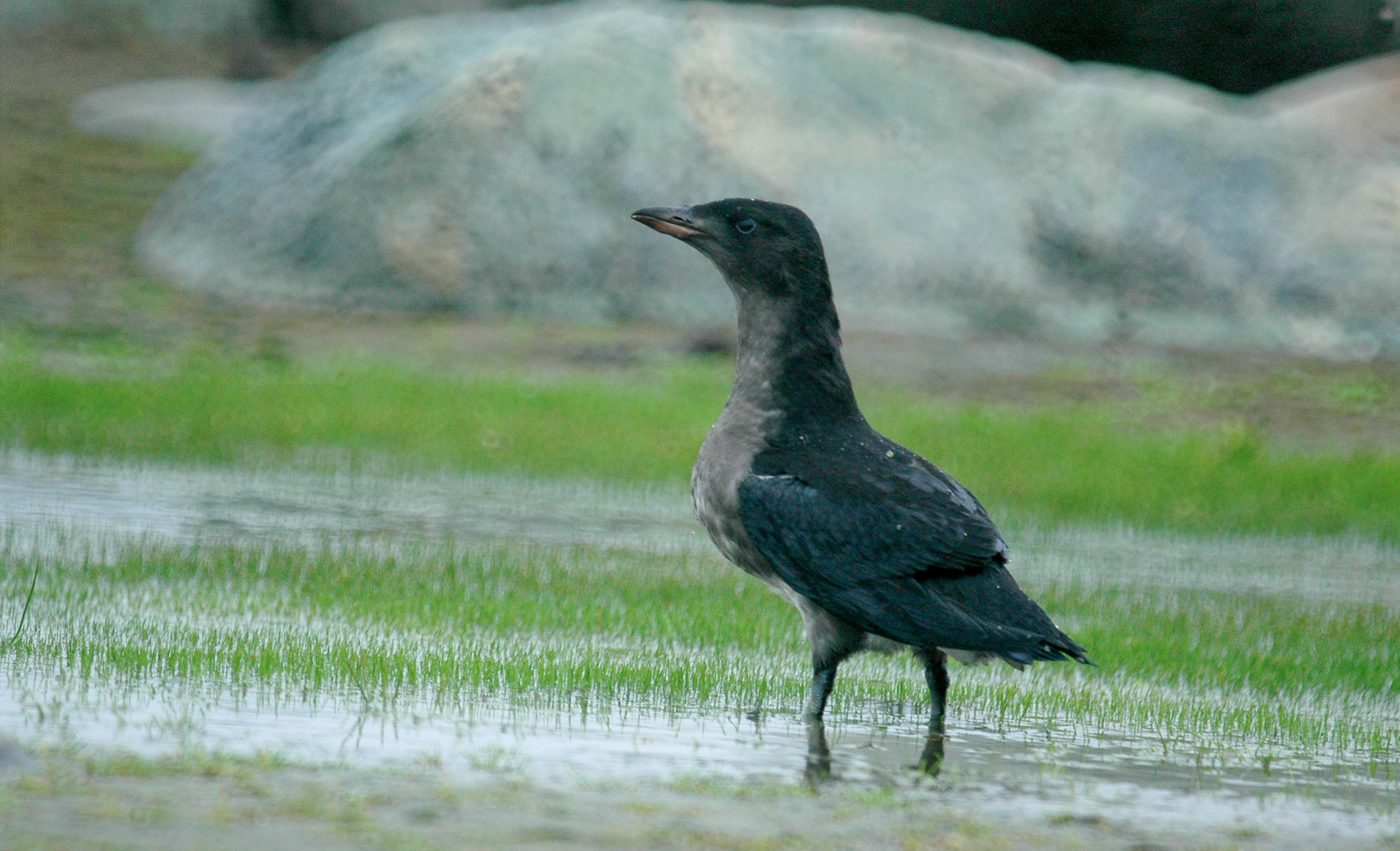
Juvenile, in Alaska

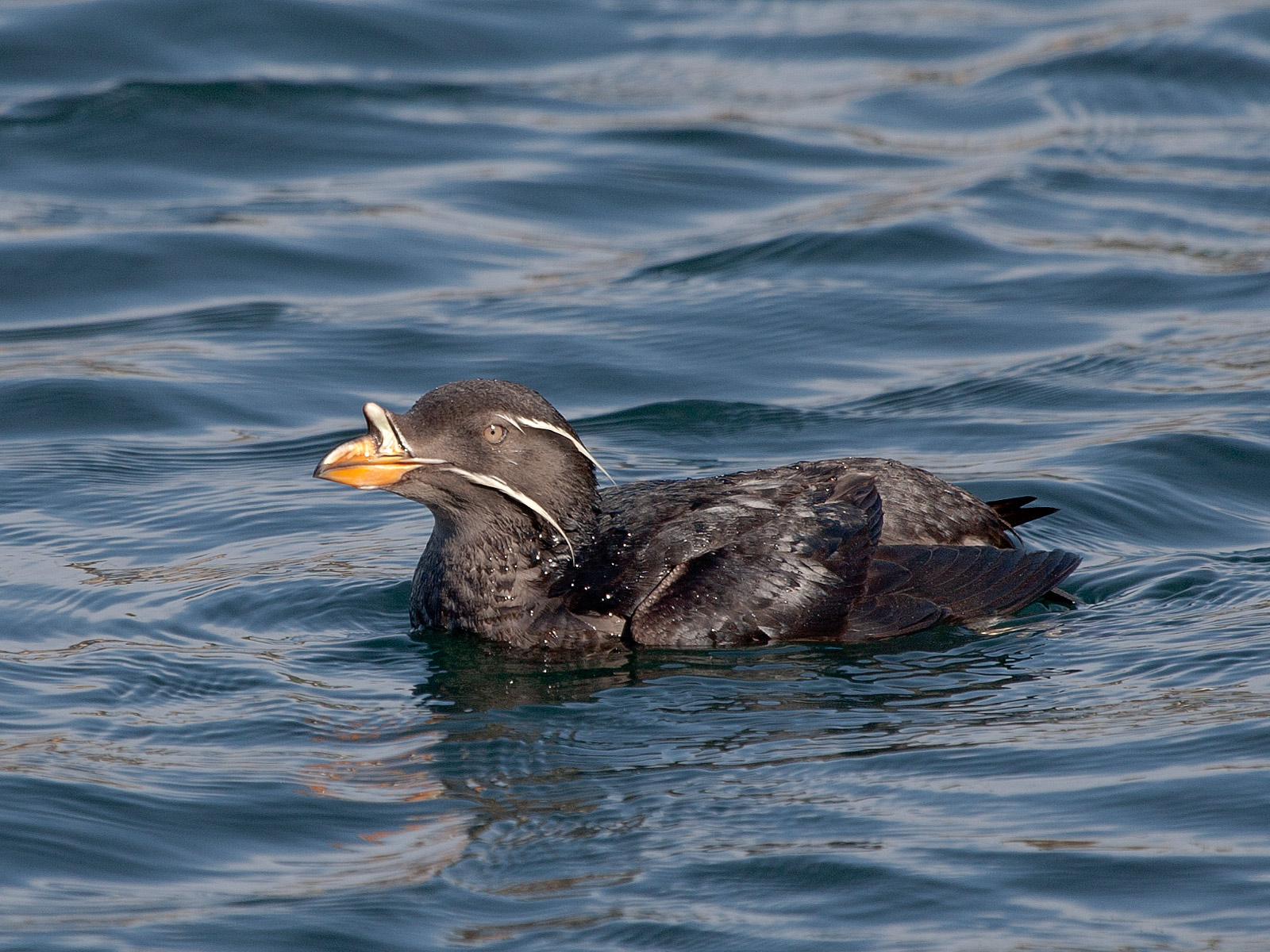
In Hokkaido

Breeding occurs in the early summer months, ranging from May to June. The auklet nests in burrows dug into the soil, or in natural caves and cavities between 1 and 5 m deep. It prefers nesting sites on slight inclines to aid take-off, as it is a poor flier. A single egg is incubated by both parents for 30–35 days. The semiprecocial chick is then fed each night with a bill full of fish (in the manner of puffins) for 35–45 days. This nocturnal behaviour is believed to be a response to predation and kleptoparasitism by gulls.

Rhinoceros auklets are monogamous, and although they migrate across similar areas during the non-breeding season, pair-mates migrate separately. However, they do synchronize their foraging activity once they return to the colony during the pre-laying period.

=== Diet and feeding ===
At sea, rhinoceros auklets feed on fish, with some krill and squid taken also. They feed inshore during the breeding season in the midwater. To catch their prey, they dive as deep as 57 meters (187 ft) for as long as 148 seconds.

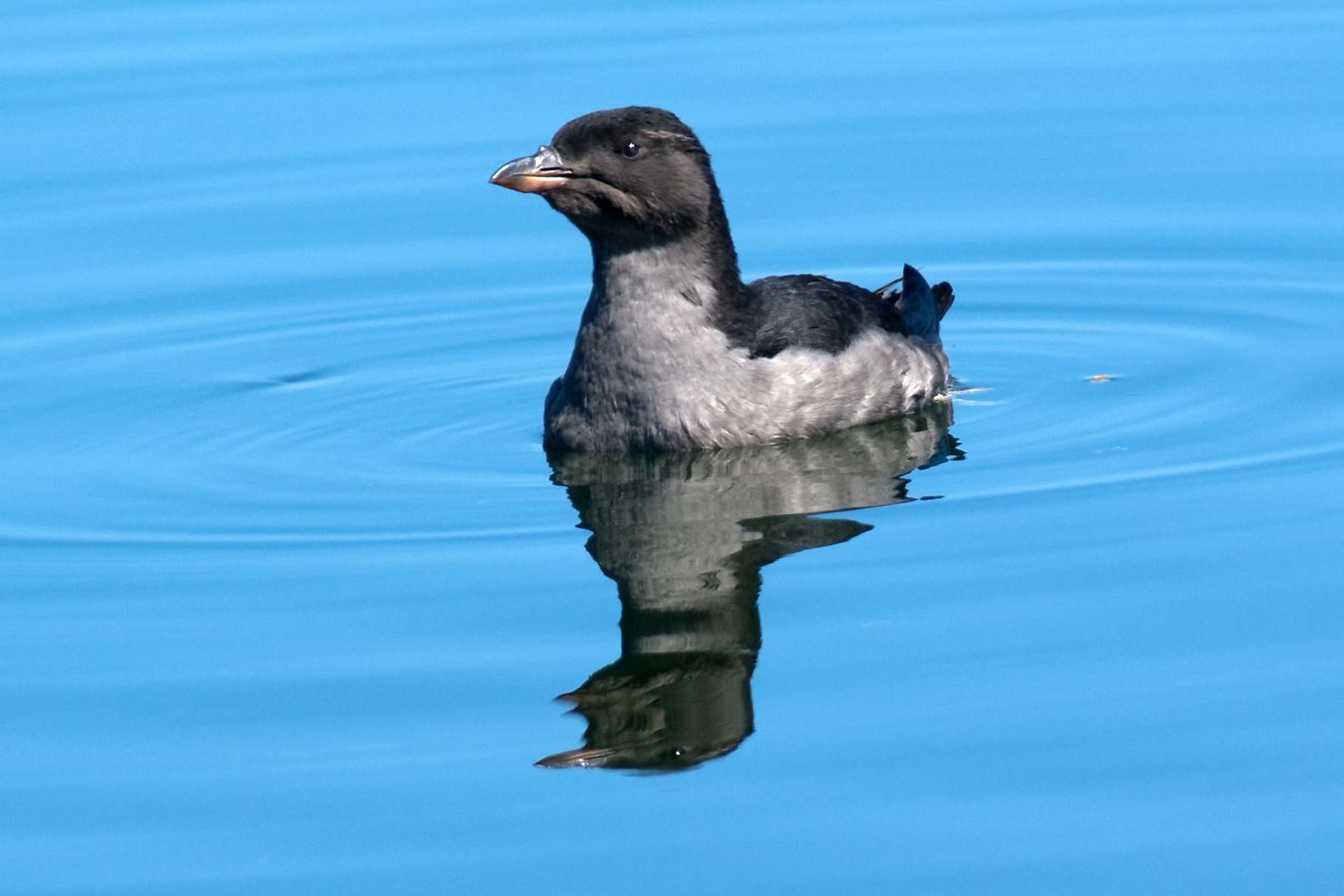
At Protection Island (Washington)

Diet studies of nesting rhinoceros auklets show that their diet is variable depending on the location of the bird's nest. At one island located near the Salish Sea off of the Washington coast, auklets feed mainly on sand lance, while at a separate island also off of the Washington coast, auklets feed on anchovy and smelt.

with fish in the Salish Sea, WA, USA

off Tofino, BC, Canada
