= List of birds of British Columbia =

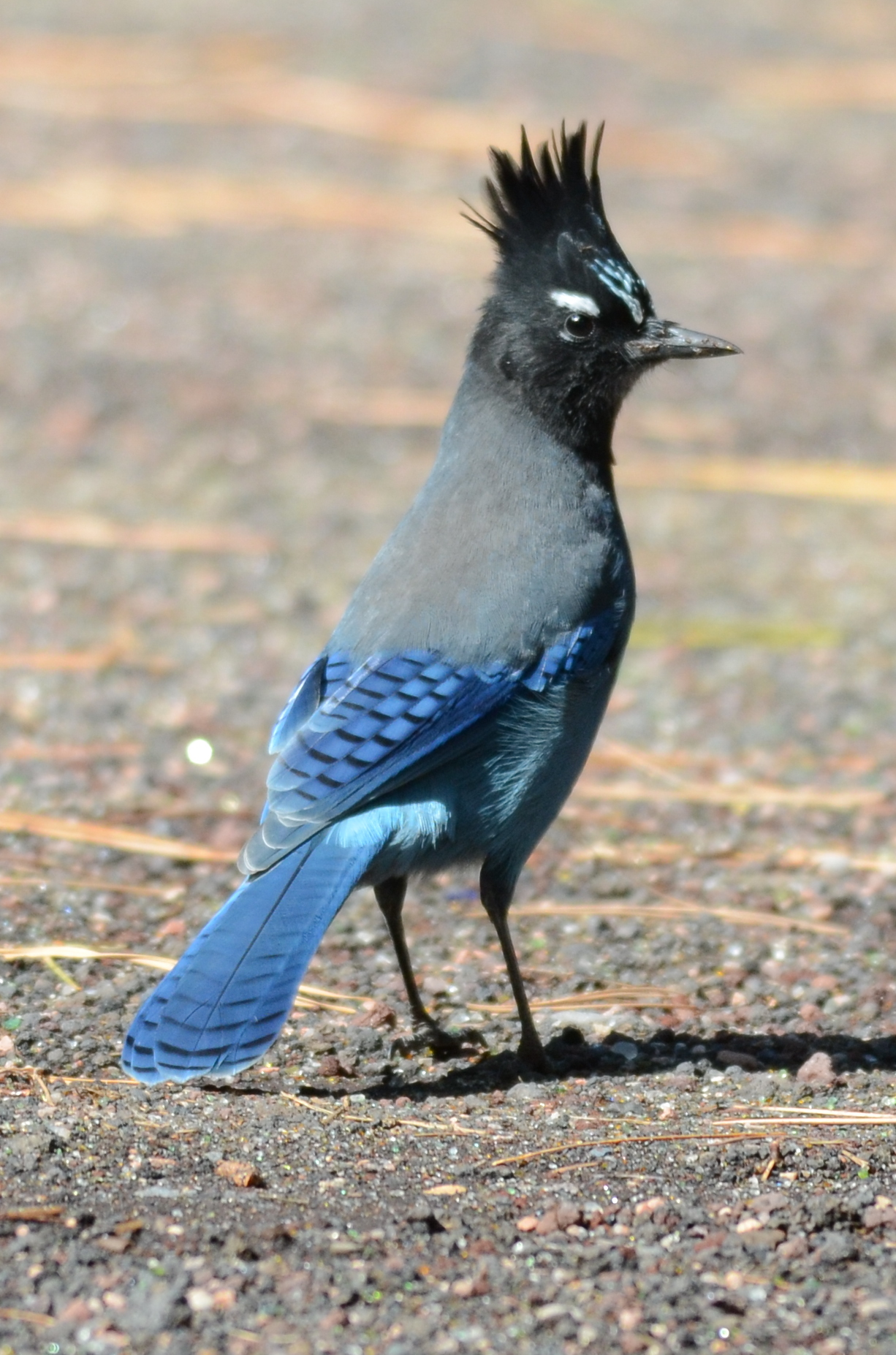
Steller's jay is the provincial bird of British Columbia.

This list of birds of British Columbia includes species documented in the Canadian province of British Columbia. As of June 2021, there are 593 species included in this list. Of them, 232 are rare or accidental and 17 have been introduced to British Columbia or elsewhere in North America. Five species have been extirpated and one is extinct. Thirty-nine species have only sight records or are classed as hypothetical (see below). An additional species of questionable origin is also included here.

This list is presented in the taxonomic sequence of the Check-list of North and Middle American Birds, 7th edition through the 62nd Supplement, published by the American Ornithological Society (AOS). Common and scientific names are also those of the Check-list, except that Canadian English spellings are used and the common names of families are from the Clements taxonomy because the AOS list does not include them.

The following tags are used to describe some categories of occurrence.

- (A) Accidental - a species seldom recorded in British Columbia
- (I) Introduced - a species that has been introduced to British Columbia by the actions of humans, either directly or indirectly
- (OU) Origin uncertain - species which might have arrived in British Columbia either from the wild or with human assistance
- (SR) Sight record - species with only sight records (no photo, specimen, or other tangible evidence)
- (H) Hypothetical - species with unverifiable records but which nevertheless have enough evidence for inclusion on the list

Population status symbols are those of the Red List published by the International Union for Conservation of Nature (IUCN). The symbols apply to the species' worldwide status, not their status solely in Canada. The symbols and their meanings, in increasing order of peril, are:

Conservation status codes
LC = least concern	NT = near threatened	VU = vulnerable
EN = endangered	CR = critically endangered	EW = extinct in the wild
EX = extinct		

== Ducks, geese, and waterfowl ==
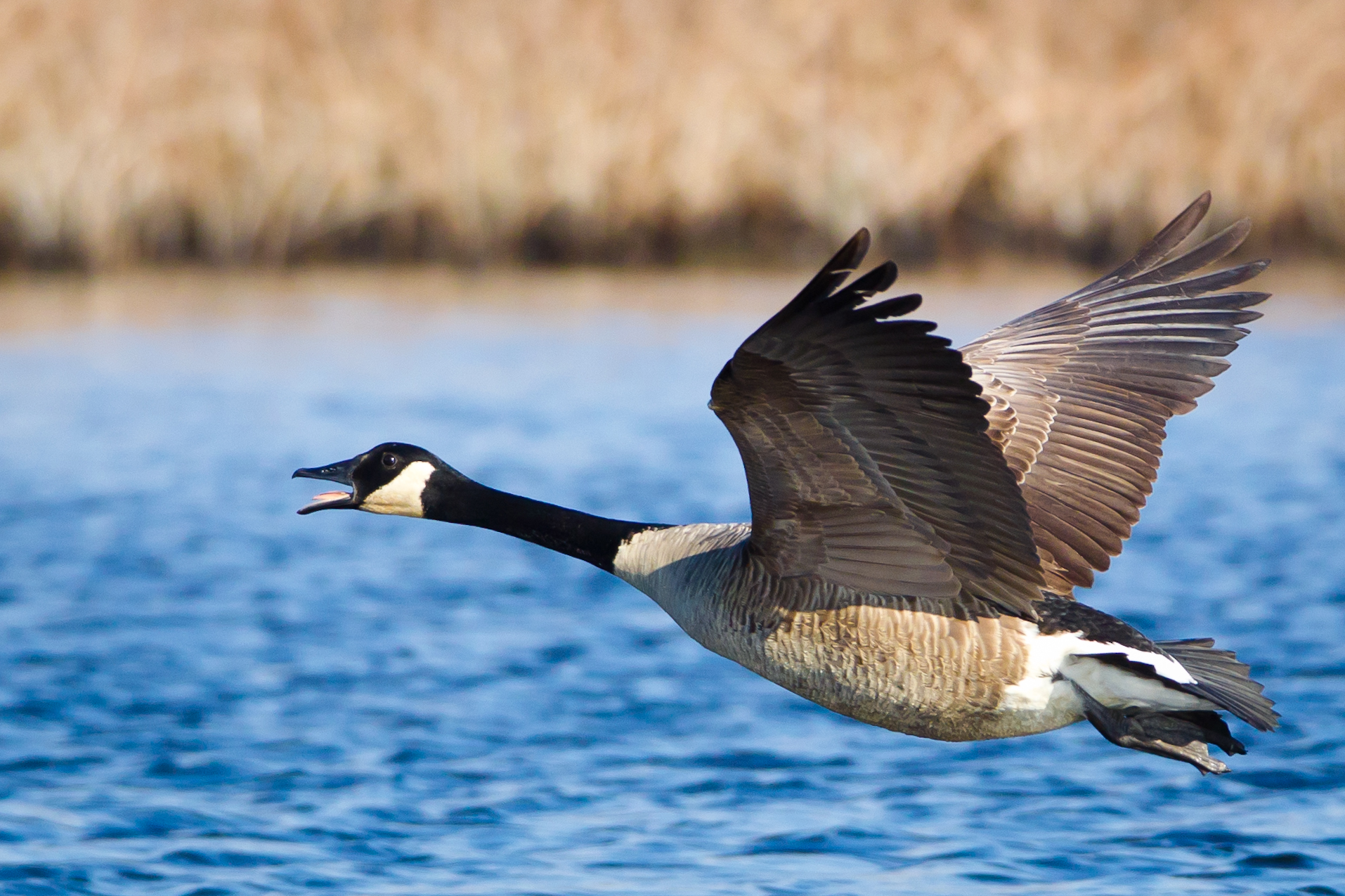
Canada goose

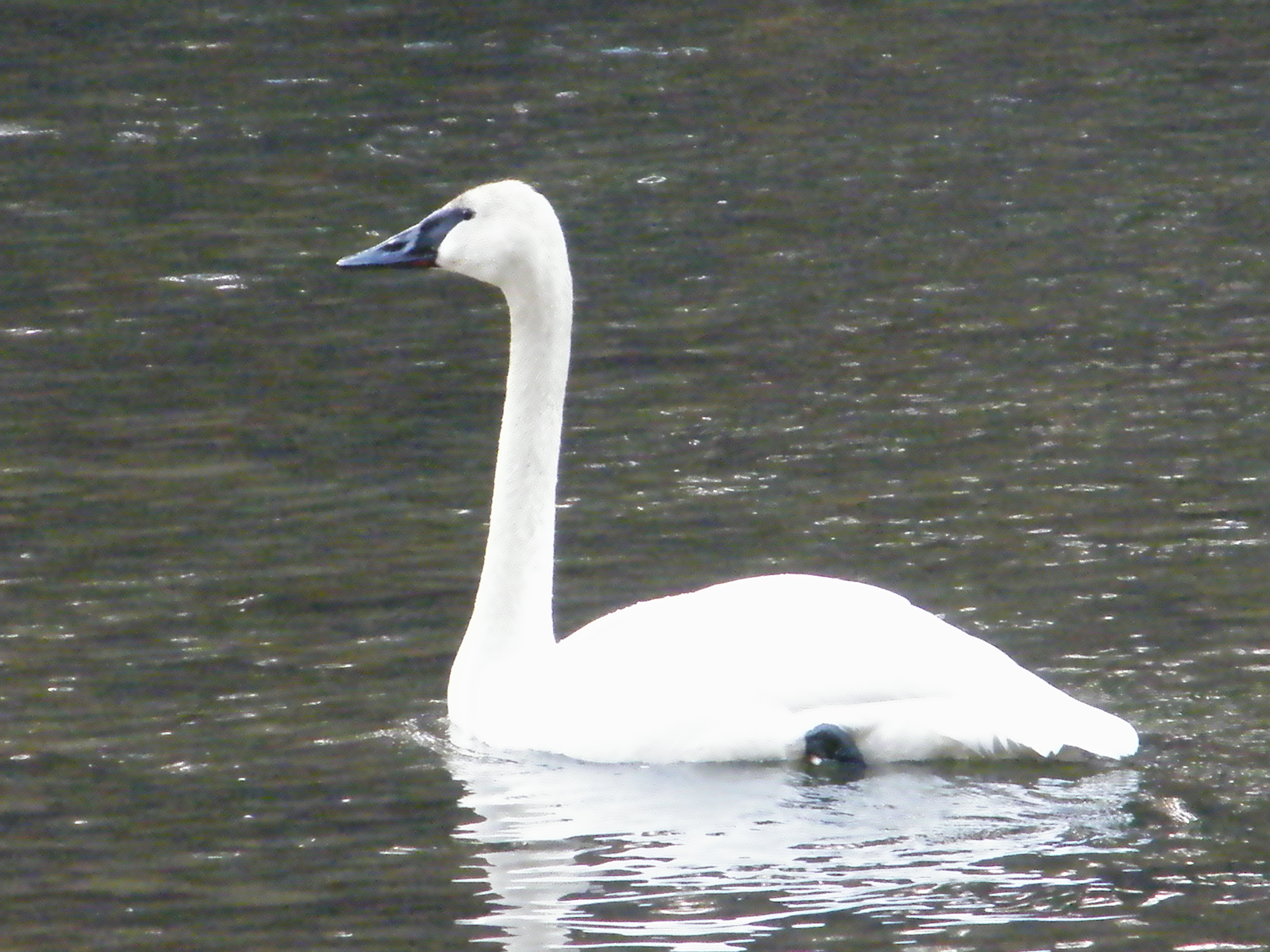
Trumpeter swan

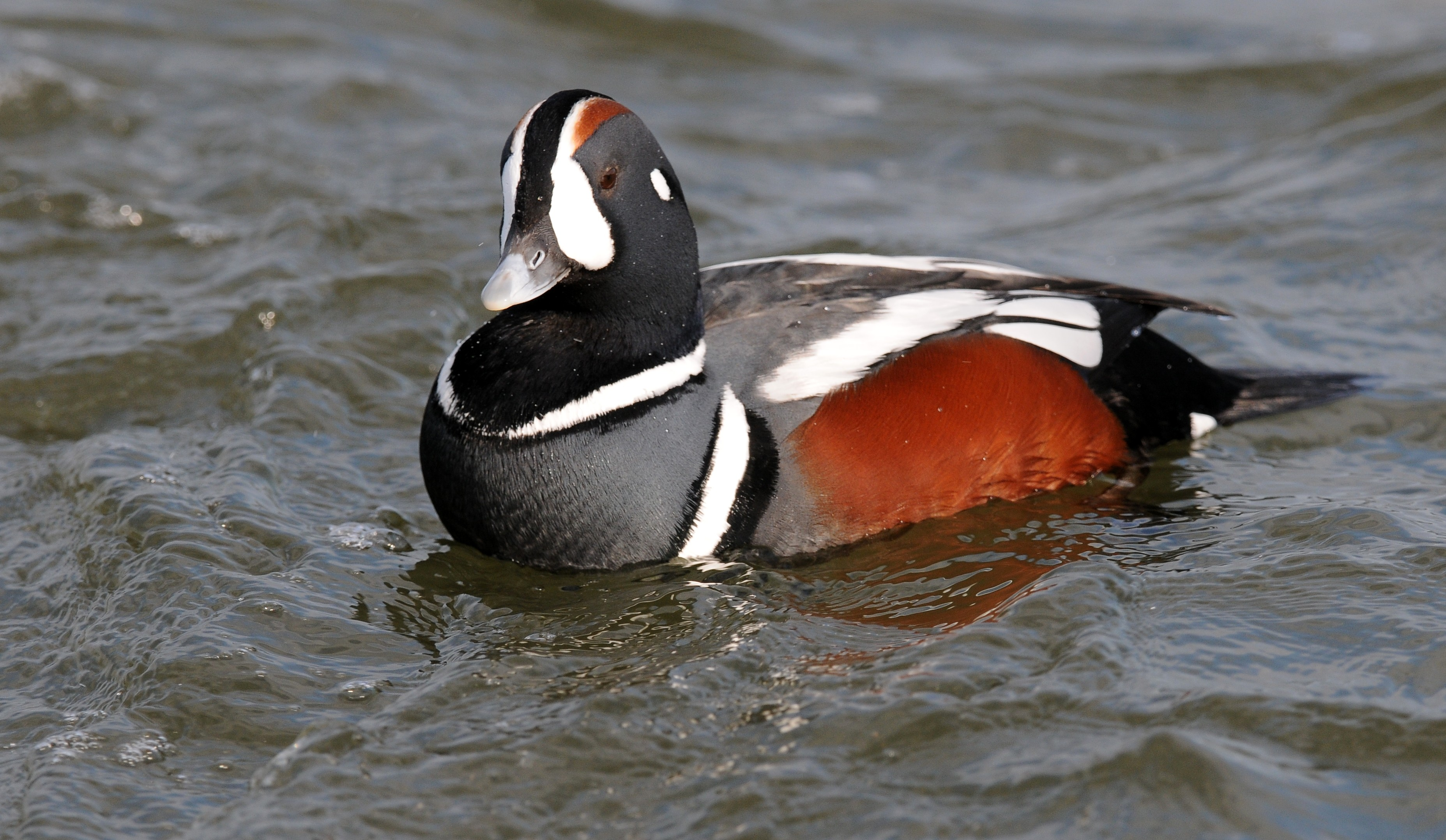
Harlequin duck

Order: Anseriformes Family: Anatidae

Anatidae includes the ducks and most duck-like waterfowl, such as geese and swans. These birds are adapted to an aquatic existence with webbed feet, bills which are flattened to a greater or lesser extent, and feathers that are excellent at shedding water due to special oils.

- Fulvous whistling-duck, Dendrocygna bicolor (A) LC
- Emperor goose, Anser canagica (A) NT
- Snow goose, Anser caerulescens LC
- Ross's goose, Anser rossii LC
- Greater white-fronted goose, Anser albifrons LC
- Taiga bean-goose, Anser fabalis (A) LC
- Pink-footed goose, Anser brachyrhynchus (A) (OU) LC
- Brant, Branta bernicla LC
- Cackling goose, Branta hutchinsii LC
- Canada goose, Branta canadensis LC
- Mute swan, Cygnus olor (I) LC
- Trumpeter swan, Cygnus buccinator LC
- Tundra swan, Cygnus columbianus LC
- Whooper swan, Cygnus cygnus (A) (OU) LC
- Wood duck, Aix sponsa LC
- Baikal teal, Sibirionetta formosa (A) LC
- Garganey, Spatula querquedula (A) LC
- Blue-winged teal, Spatula discors LC
- Cinnamon teal, Spatula cyanoptera LC
- Northern shoveler, Spatula clypeata LC
- Gadwall, Mareca strepera LC
- Falcated duck, Mareca falcata (A) NT
- Eurasian wigeon, Mareca penelope LC
- American wigeon, Mareca americana LC
- Mallard, Anas platyrhynchos LC
- American black duck, Anas rubripes (I) (A) LC
- Northern pintail, Anas acuta LC
- Green-winged teal, Anas crecca LC
- Common pochard, Aythya ferina (A) LC
- Canvasback, Aythya valisineria LC
- Redhead, Aythya americana LC
- Ring-necked duck, Aythya collaris LC
- Tufted duck, Aythya fuligula (A) LC
- Greater scaup, Aythya marila LC
- Lesser scaup, Aythya affinis LC
- Steller's eider, Polysticta stelleri (A) VU
- Spectacled eider, Somateria fischeri (A) NT
- King eider, Somateria spectabilis (A) LC
- Common eider, Somateria mollissima (A) NT
- Harlequin duck, Histrionicus histrionicus LC
- Surf scoter, Melanitta perspicillata LC
- White-winged scoter, Melanitta deglandi LC
- Black scoter, Melanitta nigra NT
- Long-tailed duck, Clangula hyemalis VU
- Bufflehead, Bucephala albeola LC
- Common goldeneye, Bucephala clangula LC
- Smew, Mergellus albellus (A) LC
- Barrow's goldeneye, Bucephala islandica LC
- Hooded merganser, Lophodytes cucullatus LC
- Common merganser, Mergus merganser LC
- Red-breasted merganser, Mergus serrator LC
- Ruddy duck, Oxyura jamaicensis LC

== New World quail ==
Order: Galliformes Family: Odontophoridae

The New World quails are small, plump terrestrial birds only distantly related to the quails of the Old World, but named for their similar appearance and habits.

- Mountain quail, Oreortyx pictus (I) (Extirpated) LC
- Northern bobwhite, Colinus virginianus (I) (Extirpated) NT
- California quail, Callipepla californica (I) LC

== Pheasants, grouse, and allies ==
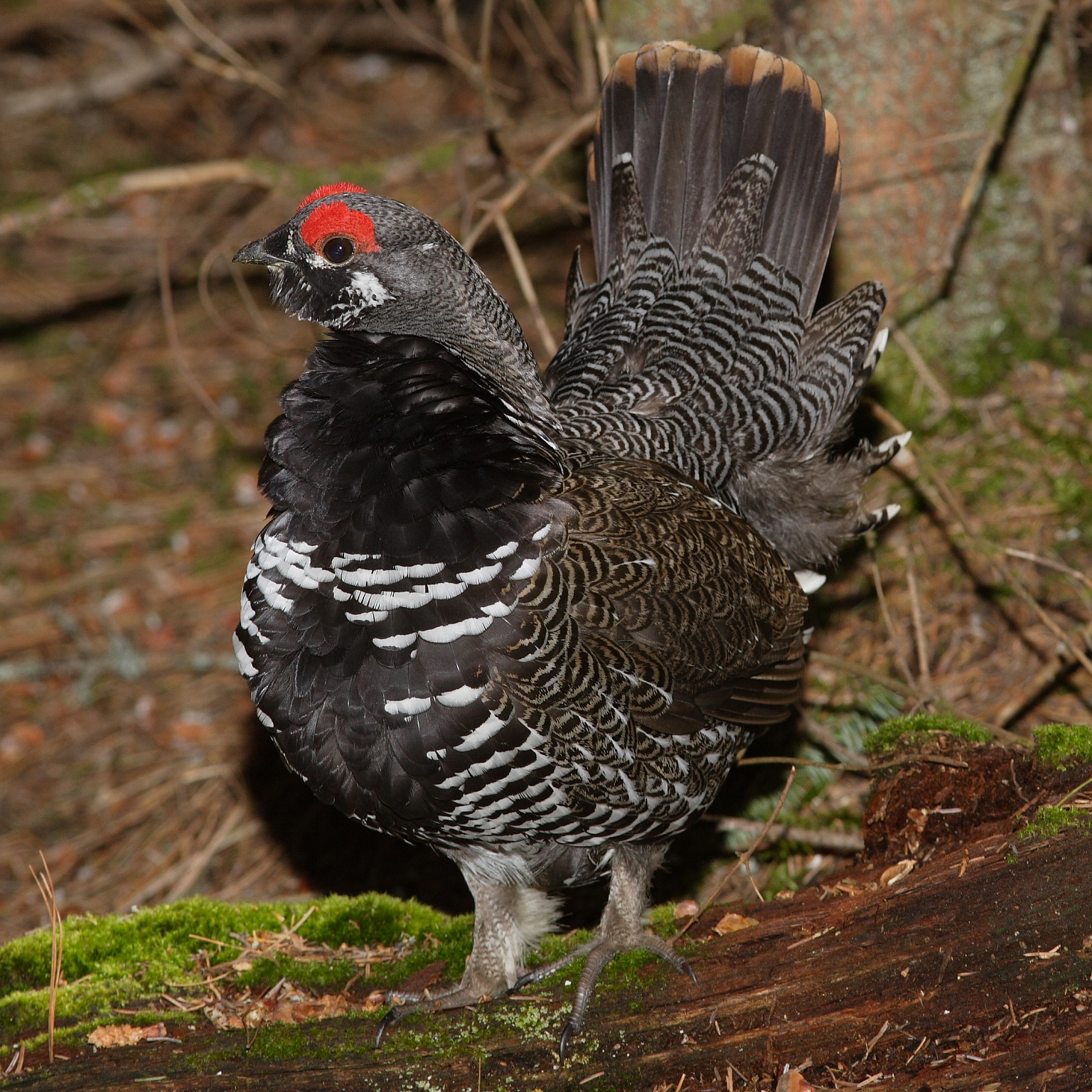
Spruce grouse

Order: Galliformes Family: Phasianidae

Phasianidae consists of the pheasants and their allies. These are terrestrial species, variable in size but generally plump with broad relatively short wings. Many species are gamebirds or have been domesticated as a food source for humans.

- Wild turkey, Meleagris gallopavo (I) LC
- Ruffed grouse, Bonasa umbellus LC
- Greater sage-grouse, Centrocercus urophasianus (Extirpated) NT
- Spruce grouse, Canachites canadensis LC
- Willow ptarmigan, Lagopus lagopus LC
- Rock ptarmigan, Lagopus muta LC
- White-tailed ptarmigan, Lagopus leucura LC
- Dusky grouse, Dendragapus obscurus LC
- Sooty grouse, Dendragapus fuliginosus LC
- Sharp-tailed grouse, Tympanuchus phasianellus LC
- Grey partridge, Perdix perdix (I) LC
- Ring-necked pheasant, Phasianus colchicus (I) LC
- Silver pheasant, Lophura nycthemera (I) (Not on the AOS Check-list) LC
- Chukar, Alectoris chukar (I) LC

== Grebes ==
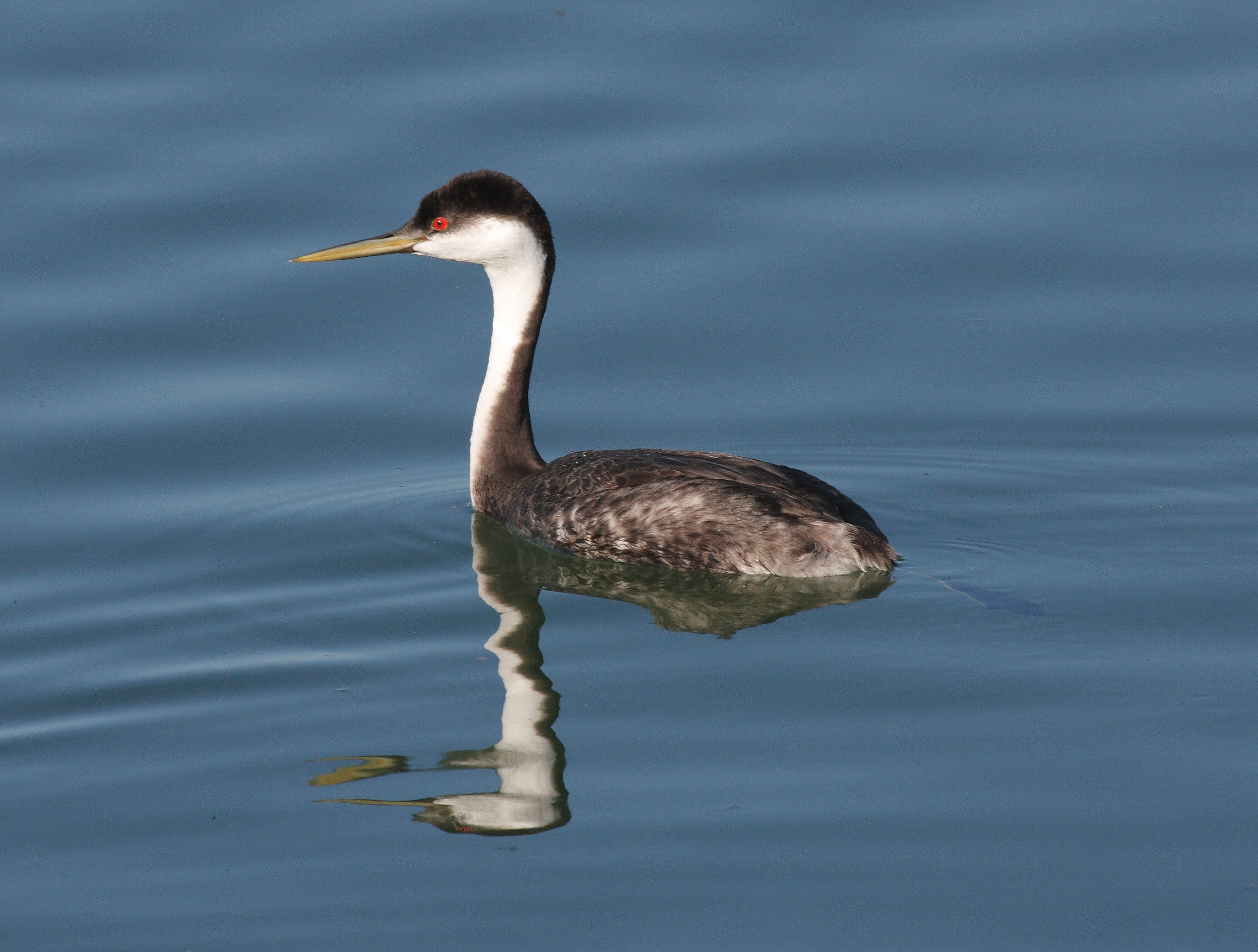
Western grebe

Order: Podicipediformes Family: Podicipedidae

Grebes are small to medium-large freshwater diving birds. They have lobed toes and are excellent swimmers and divers. However, they have their feet placed far back on the body, making them quite ungainly on land.

- Pied-billed grebe, Podilymbus podiceps LC
- Horned grebe, Podiceps auritus vu
- Red-necked grebe, Podiceps grisegena LC
- Eared grebe, Podiceps nigricollis LC
- Western grebe, Aechmophorus occidentalis LC
- Clark's grebe, Aechmophorus clarkii LC

== Pigeons and doves ==
Order: Columbiformes Family: Columbidae

Pigeons and doves are stout-bodied birds with short necks and short slender bills with a fleshy cere. They feed on seeds, fruit and plants. Unlike most other birds, the doves and pigeons produce "crop milk," which is secreted by a sloughing of fluid-filled cells from the lining of the crop. Both sexes produce this highly nutritious substance to feed to the young.

- Rock pigeon, Columba livia (I) LC
- Band-tailed pigeon, Patagioenas fasciata LC
- Oriental turtle-dove, Streptopelia orientalis (A) (I) LC
- Eurasian collared-dove, Streptopelia decaocto (I) LC
- Passenger pigeon, Ectopistes migratorius (Extinct) EX
- White-winged dove, Zenaida asiatica (A) LC
- Mourning dove, Zenaida macroura LC

== Cuckoos ==
Order: Cuculiformes Family: Cuculidae

The family Cuculidae includes cuckoos, roadrunners, and anis. These birds are of variable size with slender bodies, long tails, and strong legs.

- Common cuckoo, Cuculus canorus (A) LC
- Yellow-billed cuckoo, Coccyzus americanus (A) LC
- Black-billed cuckoo, Coccyzus erythropthalmus (A) LC

== Nightjars and allies ==
Order: Caprimulgiformes Family: Caprimulgidae

Nightjars are medium-sized nocturnal birds that usually nest on the ground. They have long wings, short legs, and very short bills. Most have small feet, of little use for walking, and long pointed wings. Their soft plumage is cryptically coloured to resemble bark or leaves.

- Lesser nighthawk, Chordeiles acutipennis (A) LC
- Common nighthawk, Chordeiles minor LC
- Common poorwill, Phalaenoptilus nuttallii LC
- Eastern whip-poor-will, Antrostomus vociferus (A) NT
- Mexican whip-poor-will, Antrostomus arizonae (A) LC

== Swifts ==
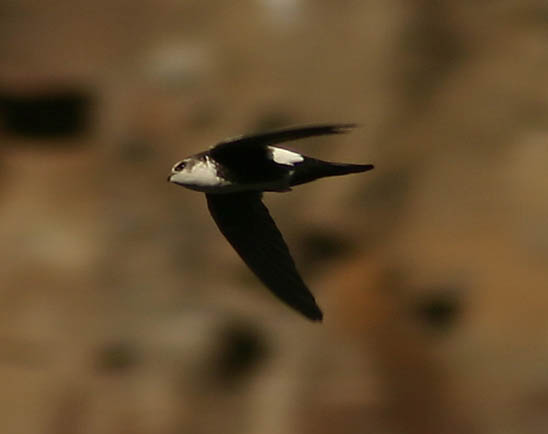
White-throated swift

Order: Apodiformes Family: Apodidae

The swifts are small birds which spend the majority of their lives flying. These birds have very short legs and never settle voluntarily on the ground, perching instead only on vertical surfaces. Many swifts have long swept-back wings which resemble a crescent or boomerang.

- Black swift, Cypseloides niger VU
- Chimney swift, Chaetura pelagica (A) (SR) VU
- Vaux's swift, Chaetura vauxi LC
- House swift, Apus nipalensis (A) ("A carcass...found in Ladner, British Columbia on 18 May 2012 appears to be the first documented record of this species in the Americas." In 2019 the species was added to the AOS Check-list appendix because it is not certain if it died before or after crossing into Canadian waters.)LC
- White-throated swift, Aeronautes saxatalis LC

== Hummingbirds ==
Order: Apodiformes Family: Trochilidae

Hummingbirds are small birds capable of hovering in mid-air due to the rapid flapping of their wings. They are the only birds that can fly backwards.

- Mexican violetear, Colibri thalassinus (A) LC
- Rivoli's hummingbird, Eugenes fulgens (A) (Not yet assessed by the IUCN)
- Ruby-throated hummingbird, Archilochus colubris (A) LC
- Black-chinned hummingbird, Archilochus alexandri LC
- Anna's hummingbird, Calypte anna LC
- Costa's hummingbird, Calypte costae (A) LC
- Broad-tailed hummingbird, Selasphorus platycercus (A) LC
- Calliope hummingbird, Stellula calliope LC
- Rufous hummingbird, Selasphorus rufus LC
- Xantus's hummingbird, Basilinna xantusii (A) LC

== Rails, gallinules, and coots ==
Order: Gruiformes Family: Rallidae

Rallidae is a large family of small to medium-sized birds which includes the rails, crakes, coots, and gallinules. The most typical family members occupy dense vegetation in damp environments near lakes, swamps, or rivers. In general they are shy and secretive birds, making them difficult to observe. Most species have strong legs and long toes which are well adapted to soft uneven surfaces. They tend to have short, rounded wings and to be weak fliers.

- Virginia rail, Rallus limicola LC
- Sora, Porzana carolina LC
- Common gallinule, Gallinula galeata (A) LC
- American coot, Fulica americana LC
- Yellow rail, Coturnicops noveboracensis (A) LC

== Cranes ==
Order: Gruiformes Family: Gruidae

- Demoiselle crane, Anthropoides virgo (A) (OU) (Not on the AOS Check-list) LC
- Sandhill crane, Antigone canadensis LC
- Common crane, Grus grus (A) LC
- Whooping crane, Grus americana (A) EN

== Stilts and avocets ==
Order: Charadriiformes Family: Recurvirostridae

Recurvirostridae is a family of large wading birds which includes the avocets and stilts. The avocets have long legs and long up-curved bills. The stilts have extremely long legs and long, thin, straight bills.

- Black-necked stilt, Himantopus mexicanus (A) LC
- American avocet, Recurvirostra americana (A) LC

== Oystercatchers ==
Order: Charadriiformes Family: Haematopodidae

The oystercatchers are large, obvious and noisy plover-like birds, with strong bills used for smashing or prising open molluscs.

- Black oystercatcher, Haematopus bachmani LC

== Plovers and lapwings ==
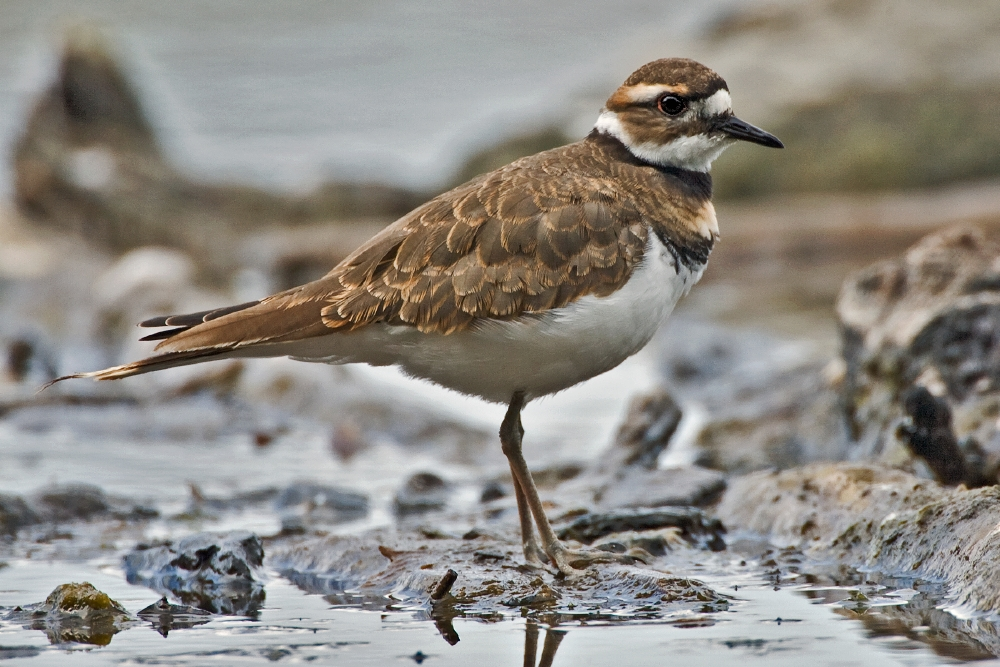
Killdeer

Order: Charadriiformes Family: Charadriidae

The family Charadriidae includes the plovers, dotterels, and lapwings. They are small to medium-sized birds with compact bodies, short thick necks, and long, usually pointed, wings. They are found in open country worldwide, mostly in habitats near water.

- Black-bellied plover, Pluvialis squatarola LC
- European golden-plover, Pluvialis apricaria (A) (SR) LC
- American golden-plover, Pluvialis dominica LC
- Pacific golden-plover, Pluvialis fulva LC
- Eurasian dotterel, Charadrius morinellus (A) (SR) LC
- Killdeer, Charadrius vociferus LC
- Common ringed plover, Charadrius hiaticula (A) LC
- Lesser sand-plover, Charadrius mongolus (A) LC
- Semipalmated plover, Charadrius semipalmatus LC
- Piping plover, Charadrius melodus (A) (SR) NT
- Snowy plover, Charadrius nivosus (A) NT
- Mountain plover, Charadrius montanus (A) (SR) NT

== Sandpipers and allies ==
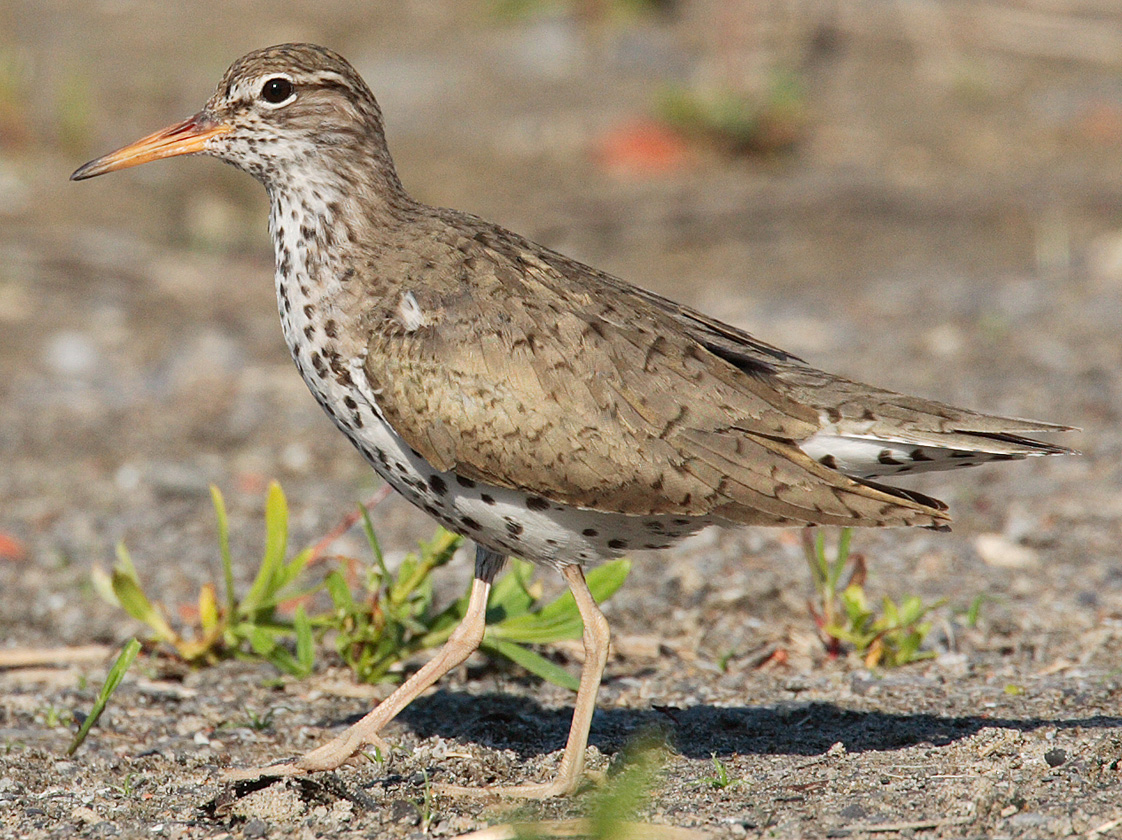
Spotted sandpiper

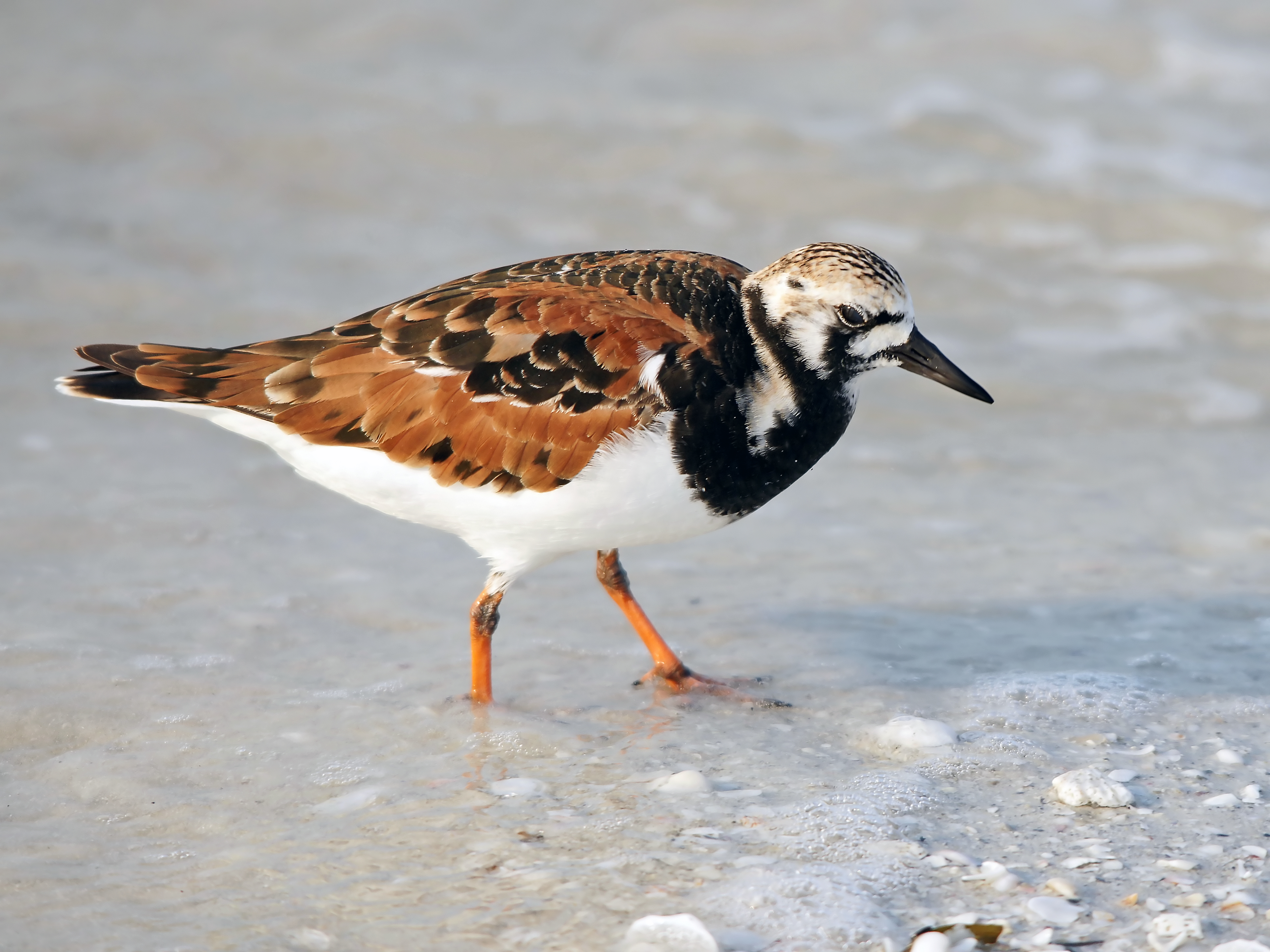
Ruddy turnstone

Order: Charadriiformes Family: Scolopacidae

Scolopacidae is a large diverse family of small to medium-sized shorebirds including the sandpipers, curlews, godwits, shanks, tattlers, woodcocks, snipes, dowitchers, and phalaropes. The majority of these species eat small invertebrates picked out of the mud or soil. Different lengths of legs and bills enable multiple species to feed in the same habitat, particularly on the coast, without direct competition for food.

- Upland sandpiper, Bartramia longicauda LC
- Bristle-thighed curlew, Numenius tahitiensis (A) VU
- Whimbrel, Numenius phaeopus (A) LC
- Little curlew, Numenius minutus (A) (SR) LC
- Long-billed curlew, Numenius americanus LC
- Far Eastern curlew, Numenius madagascariensis (A) EN
- Bar-tailed godwit, Limosa lapponica (A) NT
- Black-tailed godwit, Limosa limosa (A) (SR) NT
- Hudsonian godwit, Limosa haemastica LC
- Marbled godwit, Limosa fedoa (A) LC
- Ruddy turnstone, Arenaria interpres LC
- Black turnstone, Arenaria melanocephala LC
- Great knot, Calidris tenuirostris (A) (SR) EN
- Red knot, Calidris canutus NT
- Surfbird, Calidris virgata LC
- Ruff, Calidris pugnax (A) LC
- Sharp-tailed sandpiper, Calidris acuminata LC
- Stilt sandpiper, Calidris himantopus LC
- Curlew sandpiper, Calidris ferruginea (A) NT
- Temminck's stint, Calidris temminckii (A) LC
- Long-toed stint, Calidris subminuta (A) (SR) LC
- Spoon-billed sandpiper, Calidris pygmea (A) CR
- Red-necked stint, Calidris ruficollis (A) NT
- Sanderling, Calidris alba LC
- Dunlin, Calidris alpina LC
- Rock sandpiper, Calidris ptilocnemis LC
- Purple sandpiper, Calidris maritima (A) LC
- Baird's sandpiper, Calidris bairdii LC
- Little stint, Calidris minuta (A) LC
- Least sandpiper, Calidris minutilla LC
- White-rumped sandpiper, Calidris fuscicollis (A) LC
- Buff-breasted sandpiper, Calidris subruficollis (A) NT
- Pectoral sandpiper, Calidris melanotos LC
- Semipalmated sandpiper, Calidris pusilla (A) NT
- Western sandpiper, Calidris mauri LC
- Short-billed dowitcher, Limnodromus griseus LC
- Long-billed dowitcher, Limnodromus scolopaceus LC
- Asian dowitcher, Limnodromus semipalmatus (A) (H) (Not on the AOS Check-list) NT
- Jack snipe, Lymnocryptes minimus (A) LC
- American woodcock, Scolopax minor (A) (OU) LC
- Wilson's snipe, Gallinago delicata LC
- Terek sandpiper, Xenus cinereus (A) LC
- Spotted sandpiper, Actitis macularius LC
- Solitary sandpiper, Tringa solitaria LC
- Grey-tailed tattler, Tringa brevipes (A) LC
- Wandering tattler, Tringa incana LC
- Lesser yellowlegs, Tringa flavipes LC
- Willet, Tringa semipalmata (A) LC
- Spotted redshank, Tringa erythropus (A) LC
- Common greenshank, Tringa nebularia (A) (SR) LC
- Greater yellowlegs, Tringa melanoleuca LC
- Wood sandpiper, Tringa glareola (A) LC
- Wilson's phalarope, Phalaropus tricolor LC
- Red-necked phalarope, Phalaropus lobatus LC
- Red phalarope, Phalaropus fulicarius LC

== Skuas and jaegers ==
Order: Charadriiformes Family: Stercorariidae

Skuas and jaegers are in general medium to large birds, typically with grey or brown plumage, often with white markings on the wings. They have longish bills with hooked tips and webbed feet with sharp claws. They look like large dark gulls, but have a fleshy cere above the upper mandible. They are strong, acrobatic fliers.

- South polar skua, Stercorarius maccormicki LC
- Pomarine jaeger, Stercorarius pomarinus LC
- Parasitic jaeger, Stercorarius parasiticus LC
- Long-tailed jaeger, Stercorarius longicaudus LC

== Auks, murres, and puffins ==
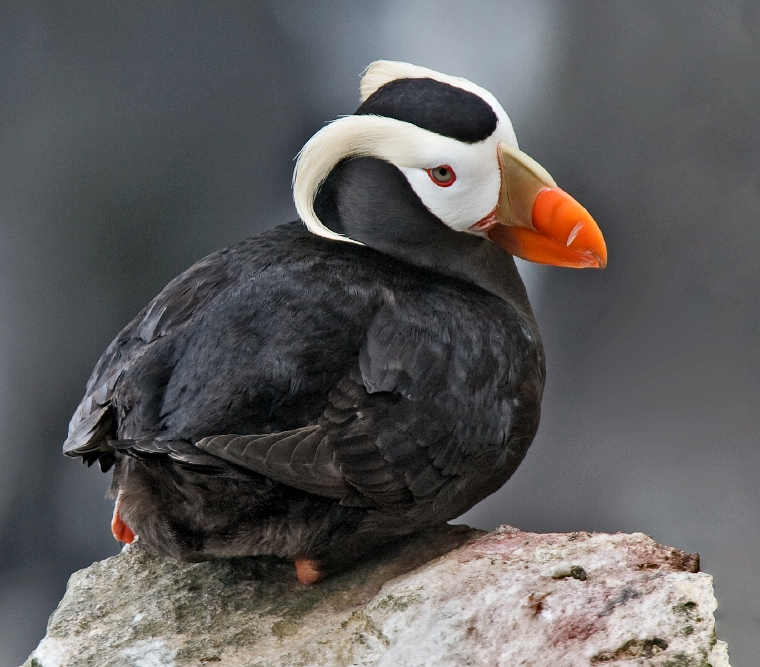
Tufted puffin

Order: Charadriiformes Family: Alcidae

Alcids are superficially similar to penguins due to their black-and-white colours, their upright posture, and some of their habits, however they are only distantly related to the penguins and are able to fly. Auks live on the open sea, only deliberately coming ashore to nest.

- Dovekie, Alle alle (A) LC
- Common murre, Uria aalge LC
- Thick-billed murre, Uria lomvia (A) LC
- Black guillemot, Cepphus grylle (A) (SR) LC
- Pigeon guillemot, Cepphus columba LC
- Long-billed murrelet, Brachyramphus perdix (A) NT
- Marbled murrelet, Brachyramphus marmoratus EN
- Kittlitz's murrelet, Brachyramphus brevirostris (A) NT
- Scripps's murrelet, Synthliboramphus scrippsi (A) VU
- Guadalupe murrelet, Synthliboramphus hypoleucus (A) (SR) EN
- Ancient murrelet, Synthliboramphus antiquus LC
- Cassin's auklet, Ptychoramphus aleuticus NT
- Parakeet auklet, Aethia psittacula LC
- Least auklet, Aethia pusilla (A) LC
- Whiskered auklet, Aethia pygmaea (A) (SR) LC
- Crested auklet, Aethia cristatella (A) LC
- Rhinoceros auklet, Cerorhinca monocerata LC
- Horned puffin, Fratercula corniculata LC
- Tufted puffin, Fratercula cirrhata LC

== Gulls, terns, and skimmers ==
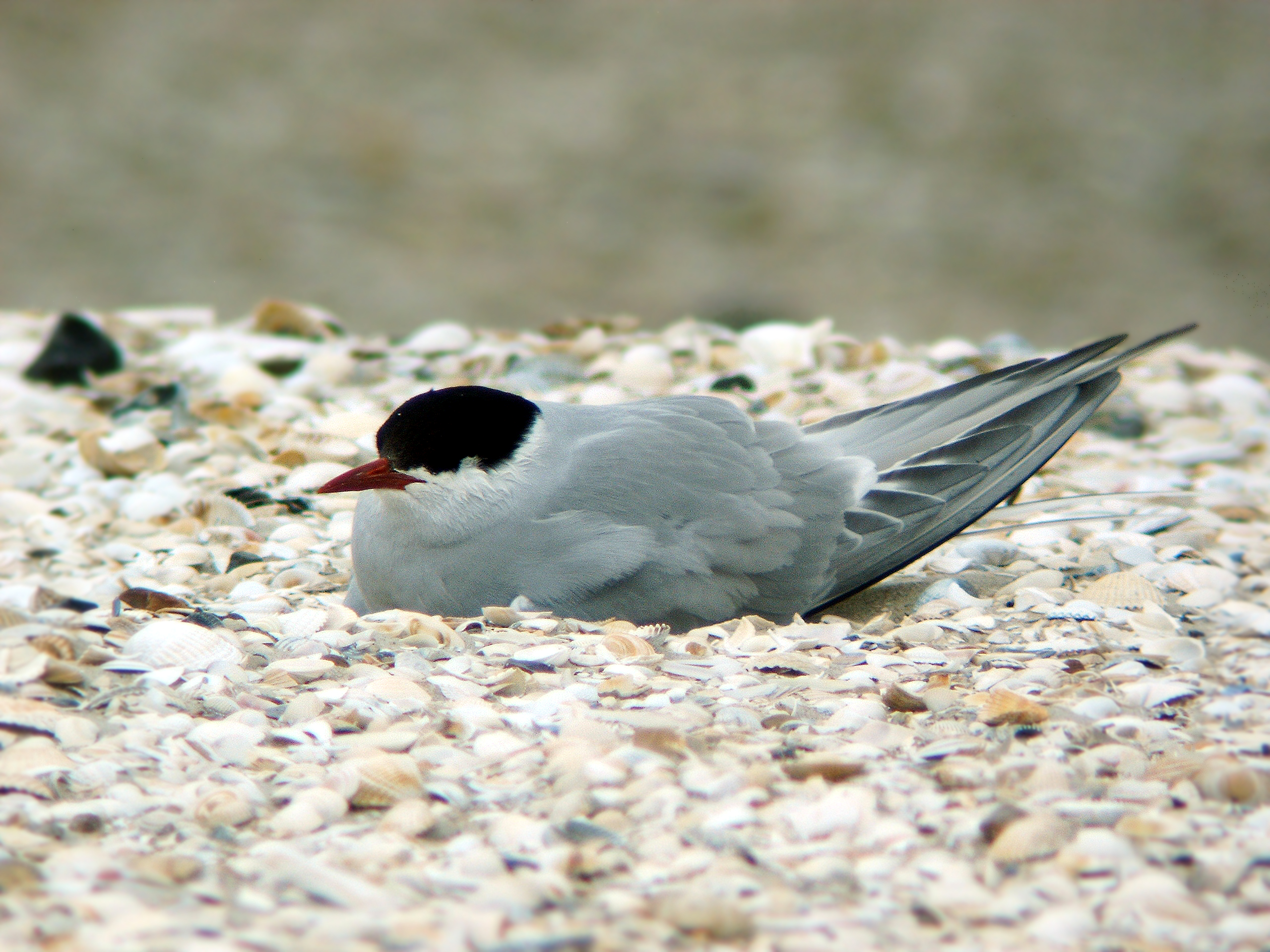
Arctic tern

Order: Charadriiformes Family: Laridae

Laridae is a family of medium to large seabirds and includes gulls, terns, kittiwakes, and skimmers. They are typically grey or white, often with black markings on the head or wings. They have stout, longish bills and webbed feet.

- Black-legged kittiwake, Rissa tridactyla LC
- Red-legged kittiwake, Rissa brevirostris (A) VU
- Ivory gull, Pagophila eburnea (A) NT
- Sabine's gull, Xema sabini LC
- Bonaparte's gull, Chroicocephalus philadelphia LC
- Black-headed gull, Chroicocephalus ridibundus (A) LC
- Little gull, HydrocolOeus minutus (A) LC
- Ross's gull, Rhodostethia rosea (A) LC
- Laughing gull, Leucophaeus atricilla (A) LC
- Franklin's gull, Leucophaeus pipixcan LC
- Black-tailed gull, Larus crassirostris (A) LC
- Heermann's gull, Larus heermanni NT
- Common gull, Larus canus (A) LC
- Short-billed gull, Larus brachyrhynchus
- Ring-billed gull, Larus delawarensis LC
- California gull, Larus californicus LC
- Western gull, Larus occidentalis LC
- Herring gull, Larus argentatus LC
- Iceland gull, Larus glaucoides LC
- Lesser black-backed gull, Larus fuscus (A) LC
- Slaty-backed gull, Larus schistisagus (A) LC
- Glaucous-winged gull, Larus glaucescens LC
- Glaucous gull, Larus hyperboreus LC
- Great black-backed gull, Larus marinus (A) LC
- Aleutian tern, Onychoprion aleuticus (A) LC
- Least tern, Sternula antillarum (A) LC
- Caspian tern, Hydroprogne caspia (A) LC
- Black tern, Chlidonias niger LC
- Common tern, Sterna hirundo LC
- Arctic tern, Sterna paradisaea LC
- Forster's tern, Sterna forsteri LC
- Elegant tern, Thalasseus elegans (A) NT

== Tropicbirds ==
Order: Phaethontiformes Family: Phaethontidae

Tropicbirds are slender white birds of tropical oceans with exceptionally long central tail feathers. Their long wings have black markings, as does the head.

- Red-tailed tropicbird, Phaethon rubricauda (A) LC

== Penguins ==
Order: Sphenisciformes Family: Spheniscidae

The penguins are a group of aquatic, flightless birds living almost exclusively in the Southern Hemisphere. Most penguins feed on krill, fish, squid and other forms of sealife caught while swimming underwater.

- Humboldt penguin, Spheniscus humboldti (A) (H) (OU) VU

== Loons ==
Order: Gaviiformes Family: Gaviidae

Loons are aquatic birds, the size of a large duck, to which they are unrelated. Their plumage is largely grey or black, and they have spear-shaped bills. Loons swim well and fly adequately, but are almost hopeless on land, because their legs are placed towards the rear of the body.

- Red-throated loon, Gavia stellata LC
- Arctic loon, Gavia arctica (A) LC
- Pacific loon, Gavia pacifica LC
- Common loon, Gavia immer LC
- Yellow-billed loon, Gavia adamsii (A) NT

== Albatrosses ==
Order: Procellariiformes Family: Diomedeidae

The albatrosses are amongst the largest of flying birds, and the great albatrosses from the genus Diomedea have the largest wingspans of any extant birds.

- Laysan albatross, Phoebastria immutabilis NT
- Black-footed albatross, Phoebastria nigripes NT
- Short-tailed albatross, Phoebastria albatrus VU

== Northern storm-petrels ==
Order: Procellariiformes Family: Hydrobatidae

The storm-petrels are the smallest seabirds, relatives of the petrels, feeding on planktonic crustaceans and small fish picked from the surface, typically while hovering. The flight is fluttering and sometimes bat-like.

- Fork-tailed storm-petrel, Hydrobates furcatus LC
- Leach's storm-petrel, Hydrobates leucorhous VU
- Ashy storm-petrel, Hydrobates homochroa (A) (SR) EN

== Shearwaters and petrels ==
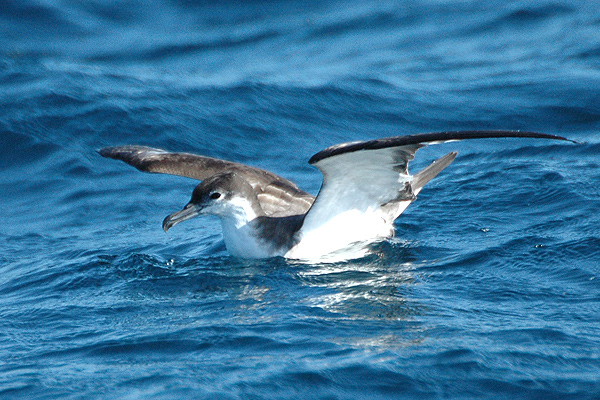
Buller's shearwater

Order: Procellariiformes Family: Procellariidae

The procellariids are the main group of medium-sized "true petrels", characterized by united nostrils with medium septum and a long outer functional primary.

- Northern fulmar, Fulmarus glacialis (A) LC
- Providence petrel, Pterodroma solandri (A) VU
- Murphy's petrel, Pterodroma ultima (A) LC
- Mottled petrel, Pterodroma inexpectata NT
- Hawaiian petrel, Pterodroma sandwichensis (A) (SR) EN
- Cook's petrel, Pterodroma cookii (A) VU
- Streaked shearwater, Calonectris leucomelas (A) (SR) NT
- Wedge-tailed shearwater, Ardenna pacifica (A) (SR) LC
- Buller's shearwater, Ardenna bulleri VU
- Short-tailed shearwater, Ardenna tenuirostris LC
- Sooty shearwater, Ardenna grisea NT
- Great shearwater, Ardenna gravis (A) NT
- Pink-footed shearwater, Ardenna creatopus VU
- Flesh-footed shearwater, Ardenna carneipes NT
- Manx shearwater, Puffinus puffinus (A) LC
- Black-vented shearwater, Puffinus opisthomelas (A) NT

== Storks ==
Order: Ciconiiformes Family: Ciconiidae

Storks are large, heavy, long-legged, long-necked wading birds with long stout bills and wide wingspans. They lack the powder down that other wading birds such as herons, spoonbills and ibises use to clean off fish slime. Storks lack a pharynx and are mute.

- Wood stork, Mycteria americana (A) LC

== Frigatebirds ==
Order: Suliformes Family: Fregatidae

Frigatebirds are large seabirds usually found over tropical oceans. They are large, black, or black-and-white, with long wings and deeply forked tails. The males have coloured inflatable throat pouches. They do not swim or walk and cannot take off from a flat surface. Having the largest wingspan-to-body-weight ratio of any bird, they are essentially aerial, able to stay aloft for more than a week.

- Magnificent frigatebird, Fregata magnificens (A) LC

== Boobies and gannets ==
Order: Suliformes Family: Sulidae

The sulids comprise the gannets and boobies. Both groups are medium-large coastal seabirds that plunge-dive for fish.

- Masked booby, Sula dactylatra (A) (SR) LC
- Nazca booby, Sula granti (A) LC
- Blue-footed booby, Sula nebouxii (A) LC
- Brown booby, Sula leucogaster (A) LC
- Red-footed booby, Sula sula (A) LC

== Cormorants and shags ==
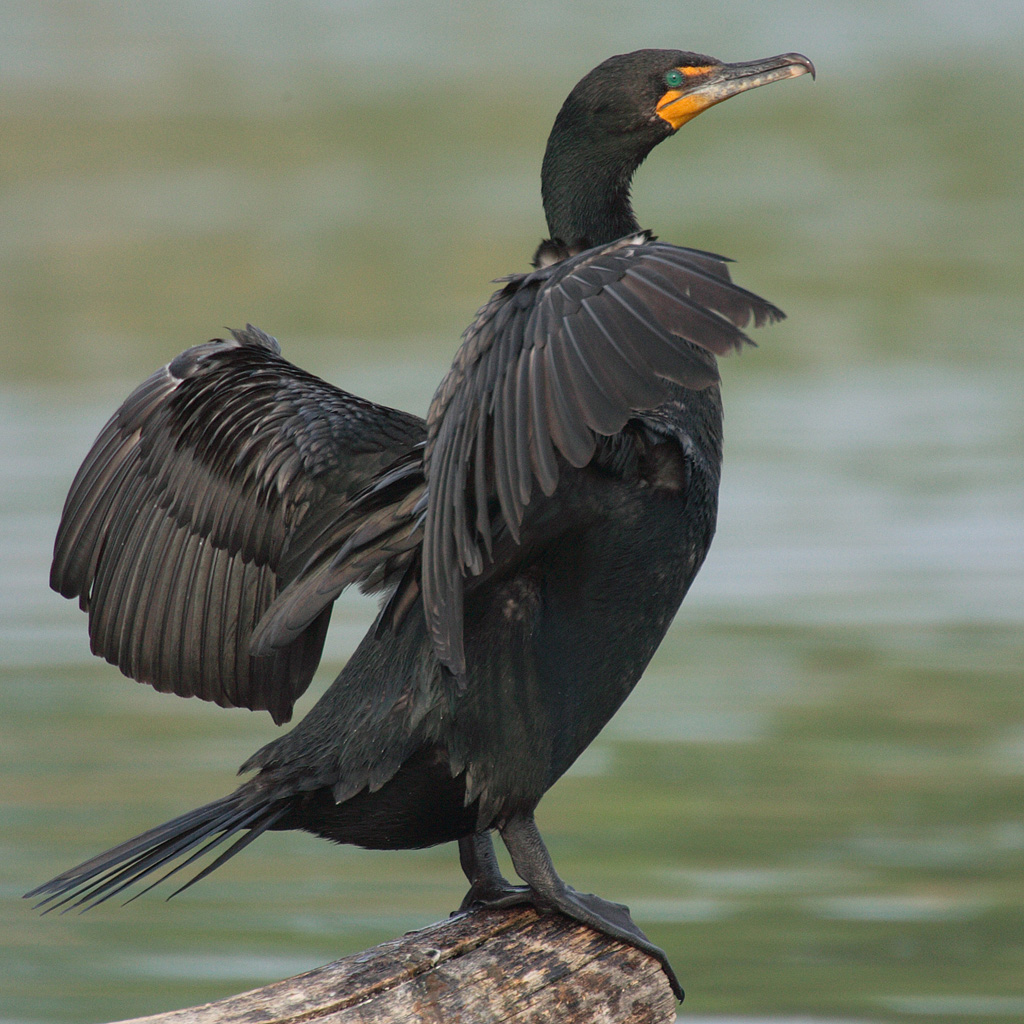
Double-crested cormorant

Order: Suliformes Family: Phalacrocoracidae

Cormorants are medium-to-large aquatic birds, usually with mainly dark plumage and areas of coloured skin on the face. The bill is long, thin, and sharply hooked. Their feet are four-toed and webbed.

- Brandt's cormorant, Urile penicillatus LC
- Red-faced cormorant, Urile urile (A) LC
- Pelagic cormorant, Urile pelagicus LC
- Double-crested cormorant, Nannopterum auritum LC

== Pelicans ==
Order: Pelecaniformes Family: Pelecanidae

Pelicans are very large water birds with a distinctive pouch under their beak. Like other birds in the order Pelecaniformes, they have four webbed toes.

- American white pelican, Pelecanus erythrorhynchos LC
- Brown pelican, Pelecanus occidentalis LC

== Herons, egrets, and bitterns ==
Order: Pelecaniformes Family: Ardeidae

The family Ardeidae contains the herons, egrets, and bitterns. Herons and egrets are medium to large wading birds with long necks and legs. Bitterns tend to be shorter necked and more secretive. Members of Ardeidae fly with their necks retracted, unlike other long-necked birds such as storks, ibises, and spoonbills.

- American bittern, Botaurus lentiginosus LC
- Least bittern, Ixobrychus exilis (A) LC
- Great blue heron, Ardea herodias LC
- Grey heron, Ardea cinerea (A) LC
- Great egret, Ardea alba LC
- Snowy egret, Egretta thula (A) LC
- Little blue heron, Egretta caerulea (A) LC
- Cattle egret, Bubulcus ibis (A) LC
- Green heron, Butorides virescens LC
- Black-crowned night-heron, Nycticorax nycticorax LC

== Ibises and spoonbills ==
Order: Pelecaniformes Family: Threskiornithidae

The family Threskiornithidae includes the ibises and spoonbills. They have long, broad wings. Their bodies tend to be elongated, the neck more so, with rather long legs. The bill is also long, decurved in the case of the ibises, straight and distinctively flattened in the spoonbills.

- White-faced ibis, Plegadis chihi (A) LC

== New World vultures ==
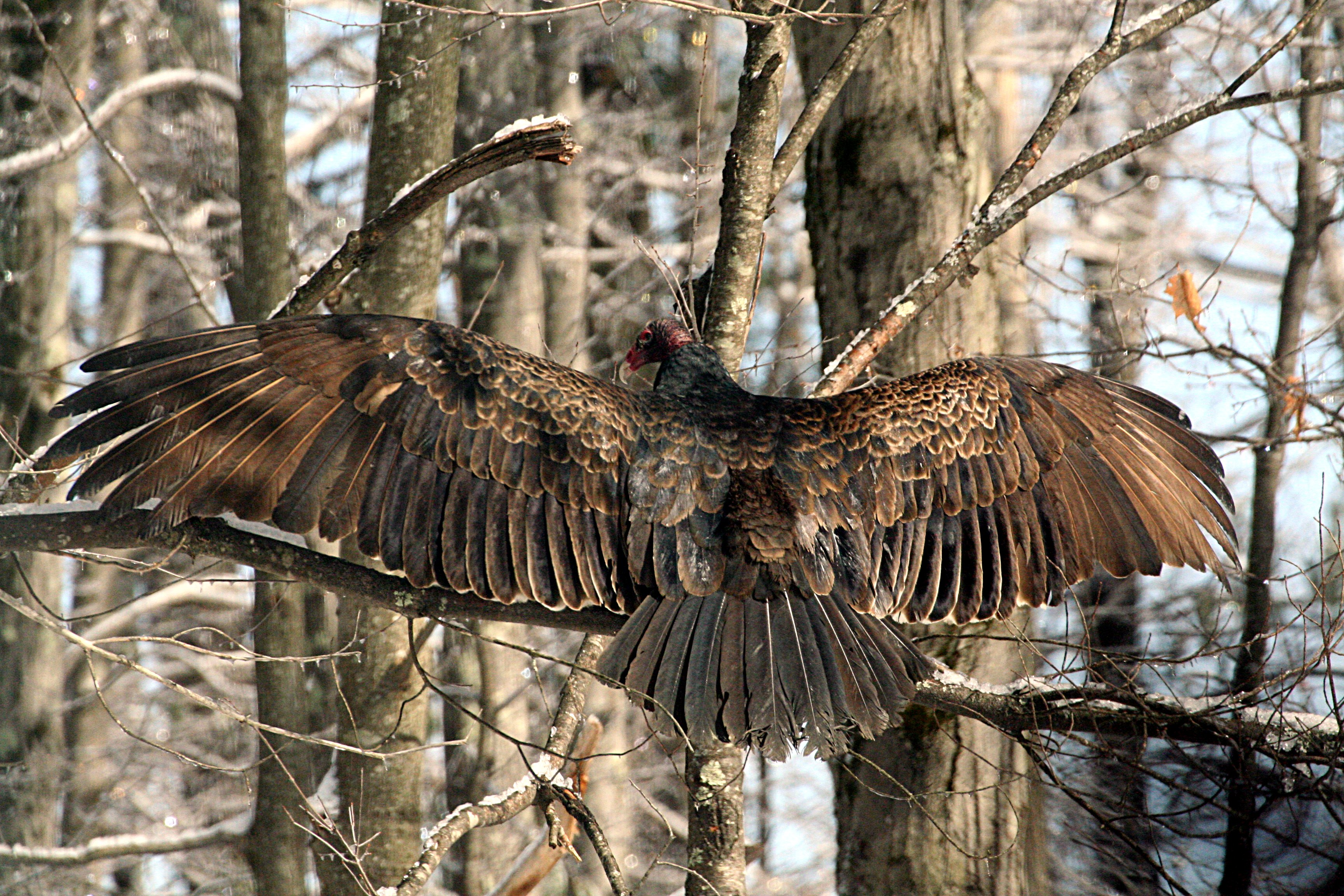
Turkey vulture

Order: Cathartiformes Family: Cathartidae

The New World vultures are not closely related to Old World vultures, but superficially resemble them because of convergent evolution. Like the Old World vultures, they are scavengers. However, unlike Old World vultures, which find carcasses by sight, New World vultures have a good sense of smell with which they locate carcasses.

- California condor, Gymnogyps californianus (A) (H) (Extirpated) CR
- Black vulture, Coragyps atratus (A) LC
- Turkey vulture, Cathartes aura LC

== Osprey ==
Order: Accipitriformes Family: Pandionidae

Pandionidae is a family of fish-eating birds of prey possessing a very large, powerful hooked beak for tearing flesh from their prey, strong legs, powerful talons, and keen eyesight. The family is monotypic.

- Osprey, Pandion haliaetus LC

== Hawks, eagles, and kites ==
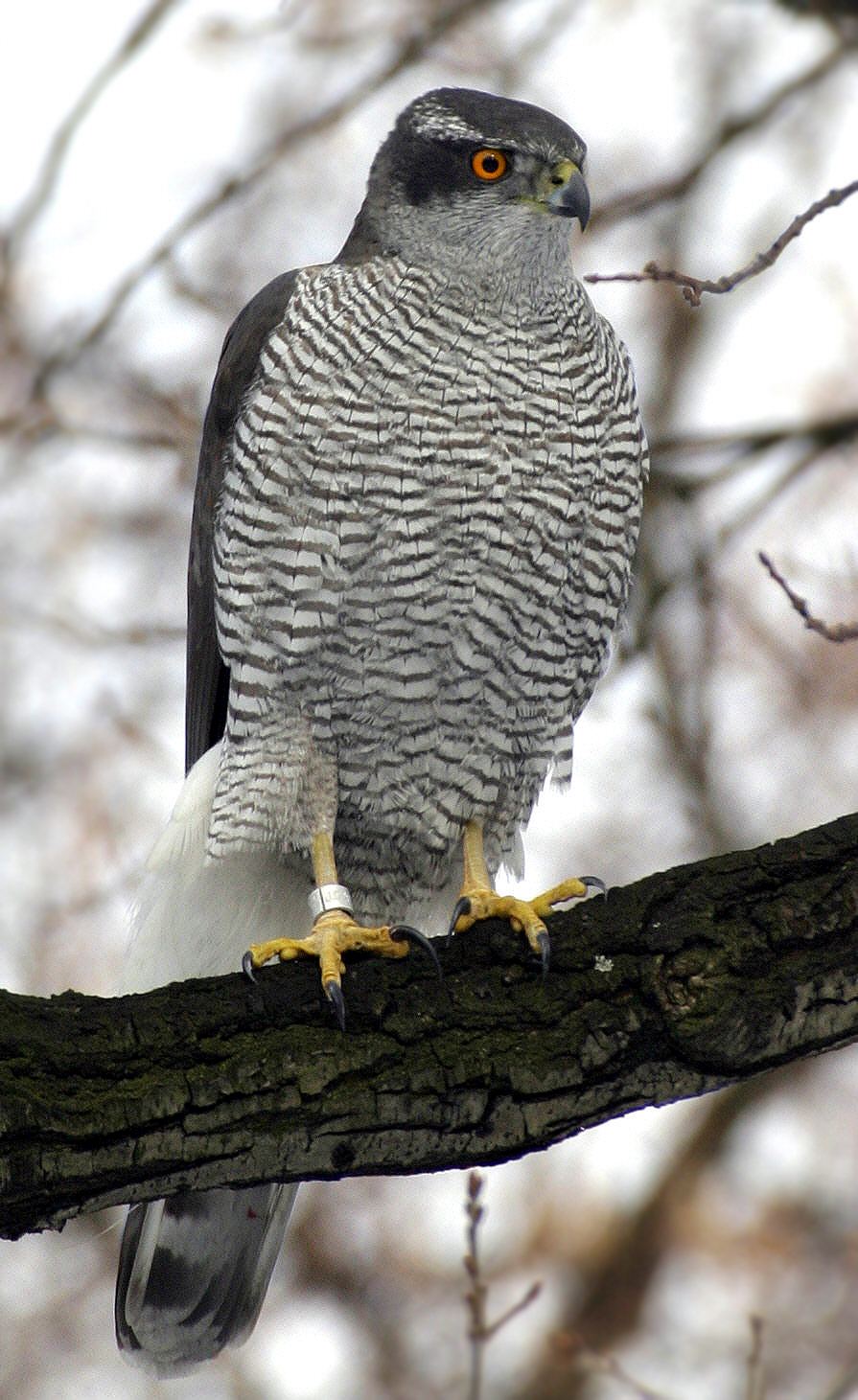
American goshawk

Order: Accipitriformes Family: Accipitridae

Accipitridae is a family of birds of prey which includes hawks, eagles, kites, harriers, and Old World vultures. These birds have very large powerful hooked beaks for tearing flesh from their prey, strong legs, powerful talons, and keen eyesight.

- White-tailed kite, Elanus leucurus (A) LC
- Golden eagle, Aquila chrysaetos LC
- Northern harrier, Circus hudsonius (Not yet assessed by the IUCN)
- Sharp-shinned hawk, Accipiter striatus LC
- Cooper's hawk, Accipiter cooperii LC
- American goshawk, Accipiter atricapillus LC
- Bald eagle, Haliaeetus leucocephalus LC
- Red-shouldered hawk, Buteo lineatus (A) LC
- Broad-winged hawk, Buteo platypterus LC
- Swainson's hawk, Buteo swainsoni LC
- Red-tailed hawk, Buteo jamaicensis LC
- Ferruginous hawk, Buteo regalis LC
- Rough-legged hawk, Buteo lagopus LC

== Barn-owls ==
Order: Strigiformes Family: Tytonidae

Owls in the family Tytonidae are medium to large owls with large heads and characteristic heart-shaped faces.

- Barn owl, Tyto furcata LC

== Owls ==
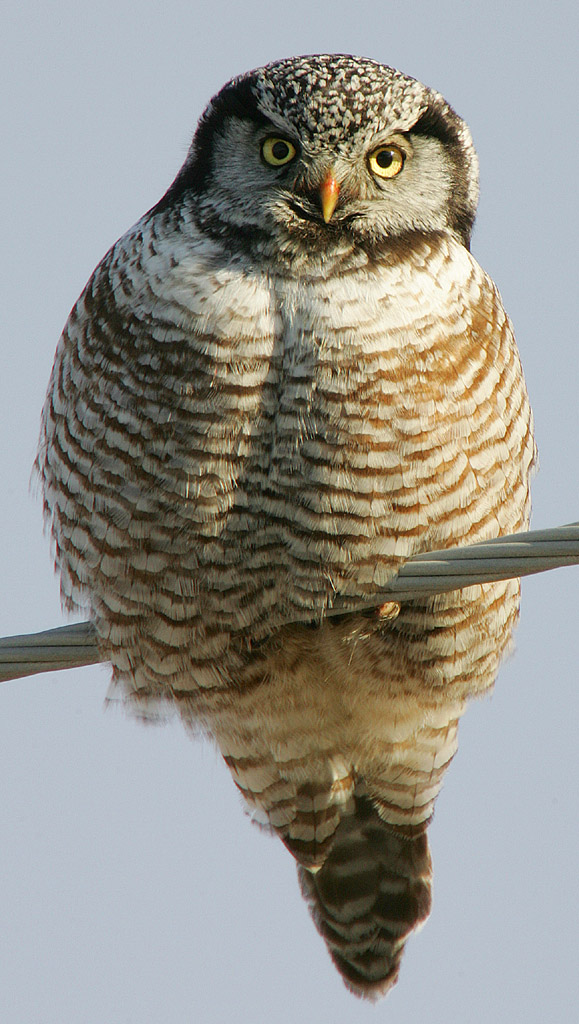
Northern hawk owl

Order: Strigiformes Family: Strigidae

Typical owls are small to large solitary nocturnal birds of prey. They have large forward-facing eyes and ears, a hawk-like beak, and a conspicuous circle of feathers around each eye called a facial disk.

- Flammulated owl, Otus flammeolus LC
- Western screech-owl, Megascops kennicottii LC
- Great horned owl, Bubo virginianus LC
- Snowy owl, Bubo scandiacus LC
- Northern hawk owl, Surnia ulula LC
- Northern pygmy-owl, Glaucidium gnoma LC
- Burrowing owl, Athene cunicularia (A) LC
- Spotted owl, Strix occidentalis NT
- Barred owl, Strix varia LC
- Great grey owl, Strix nebulosa LC
- Long-eared owl, Asio otus LC
- Short-eared owl, Asio flammeus LC
- Boreal owl, Aegolius funereus LC
- Northern saw-whet owl, Aegolius acadicus LC

== Kingfishers ==
Order: Coraciiformes Family: Alcedinidae

Kingfishers are medium-sized birds with large heads, long, pointed bills, short legs, and stubby tails.

- Belted kingfisher, Megaceryle alcyon LC

== Woodpeckers ==
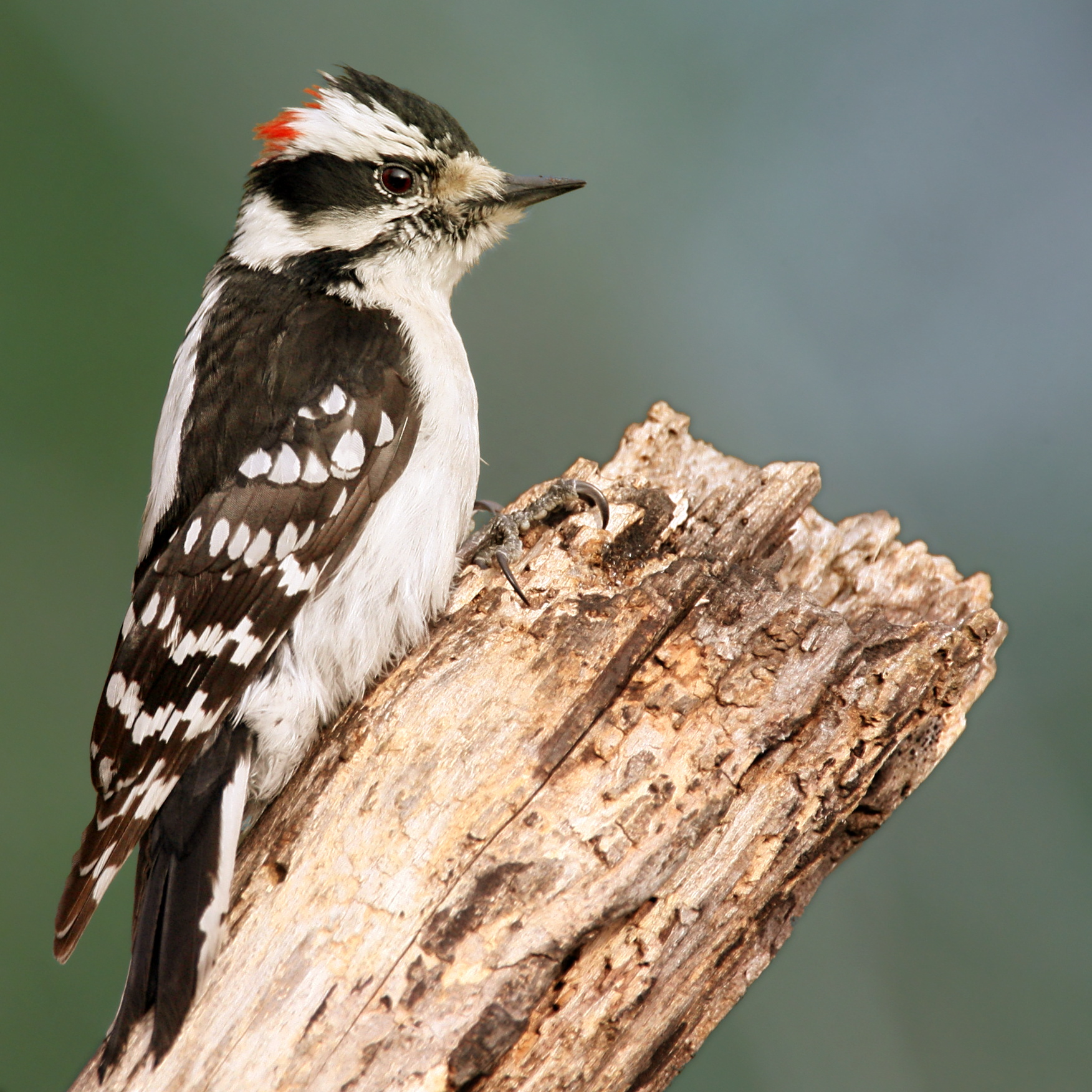
Downy woodpecker

Order: Piciformes Family: Picidae

Woodpeckers are small to medium-sized birds with chisel-like beaks, short legs, stiff tails, and long tongues used for capturing insects. Some species have feet with two toes pointing forward and two backward, while several species have only three toes. Many woodpeckers have the habit of tapping noisily on tree trunks with their beaks.

- Lewis's woodpecker, Melanerpes lewis LC
- Red-headed woodpecker, Melanerpes erythrocephalus LC
- Acorn woodpecker, Melanerpes formicivorus (A) LC
- Williamson's sapsucker, Sphyrapicus thyroideus LC
- Yellow-bellied sapsucker, Sphyrapicus varius LC
- Red-naped sapsucker, Sphyrapicus nuchalis LC
- Red-breasted sapsucker, Sphyrapicus ruber LC
- American three-toed woodpecker, Picoides dorsalis LC
- Black-backed woodpecker, Picoides arcticus LC
- Downy woodpecker, Dryobates pubescens LC
- Hairy woodpecker, Dryobates villosus LC
- White-headed woodpecker, Dryobates albolarvatus (A) LC
- Northern flicker, Colaptes auratus LC
- Pileated woodpecker, Dryocopus pileatus LC

== Falcons and caracaras ==
Order: Falconiformes Family: Falconidae

Falconidae is a family of diurnal birds of prey, notably the falcons and caracaras. They differ from hawks, eagles, and kites in that they kill with their beaks instead of their talons.

- Crested caracara, Caracara plancus (A) LC
- Eurasian kestrel, Falco tinnunculus (A) LC
- American kestrel, Falco sparverius LC
- Merlin, Falco columbarius LC
- Eurasian hobby, Falco subbuteo (A) (SR) LC
- Gyrfalcon, Falco rusticolus LC
- Peregrine falcon, Falco peregrinus LC
- Prairie falcon, Falco mexicanus LC

== Tyrant flycatchers ==
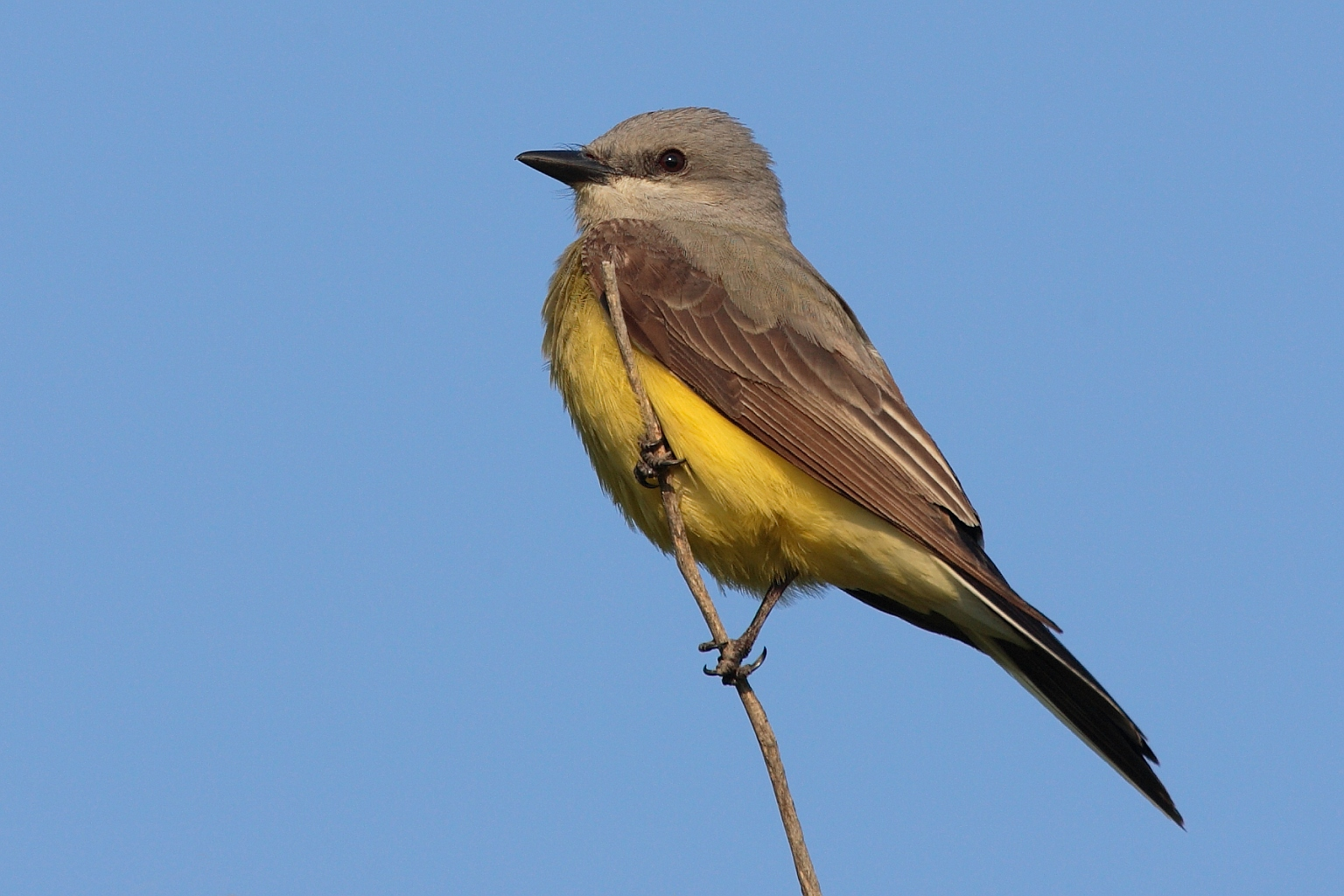
Western kingbird

Order: Passeriformes Family: Tyrannidae

Tyrant flycatchers are Passerine birds which occur throughout North and South America. They superficially resemble the Old World flycatchers, but are more robust and have stronger bills. They do not have the sophisticated vocal capabilities of the songbirds. Most, but not all, are rather plain. As the name implies, most are insectivorous.

- Ash-throated flycatcher, Myiarchus cinerascens (A) LC
- Great crested flycatcher, Myiarchus crinitus (A) LC
- Great kiskadee, Pitangus sulphuratus (A) (H) LC
- Tropical kingbird, Tyrannus melancholicus (A) LC
- Thick-billed kingbird, Tyrannus crassirostris (A) LC
- Western kingbird, Tyrannus verticalis LC
- Eastern kingbird, Tyrannus tyrannus LC
- Grey kingbird, Tyrannus dominicensis (A) LC
- Scissor-tailed flycatcher, Tyrannus forficatus (A) LC
- Fork-tailed flycatcher, Tyrannus savana (A) (H) LC
- Olive-sided flycatcher, Contopus cooperi NT
- Western wood-pewee, Contopus sordidulus LC
- Eastern wood-pewee, Contopus virens LC
- Yellow-bellied flycatcher, Empidonax flaviventris LC
- Acadian flycatcher, Empidonax virescens (A) LC
- Alder flycatcher, Empidonax alnorum LC
- Willow flycatcher, Empidonax traillii LC
- Least flycatcher, Empidonax minimus LC
- Hammond's flycatcher, Empidonax hammondii LC
- Grey flycatcher, Empidonax wrightii (A) LC
- Dusky flycatcher, Empidonax oberholseri LC
- Western flycatcher, Empidonax difficilis LC
- Black phoebe, Sayornis nigricans (A) LC
- Eastern phoebe, Sayornis phoebe LC
- Say's phoebe, Sayornis saya LC
- Vermilion flycatcher, Pyrocephalus rubinus (A) (SR) LC

== Vireos, shrike-babblers, and erpornis ==
Order: Passeriformes Family: Vireonidae

The vireos are a group of small to medium-sized passerine birds mostly restricted to the New World, though a few other members of the family are found in Asia. They are typically greenish in colour and resemble wood warblers apart from their heavier bills.

- Black-capped vireo, Vireo atricapilla (A) NT
- Bell's vireo, Vireo bellii (A) LC
- White-eyed vireo, Vireo griseus (A) LC
- Cassin's vireo, Vireo cassinii LC
- Blue-headed vireo, Vireo solitarius LC
- Hutton's vireo, Vireo huttoni LC
- Yellow-throated vireo, Vireo flavifrons (A) (H) LC
- Philadelphia vireo, Vireo philadelphicus LC
- Warbling vireo, Vireo gilvus LC
- Red-eyed vireo, Vireo olivaceus LC
- Yellow-green vireo, Vireo flavoviridis (A) LC

== Shrikes ==
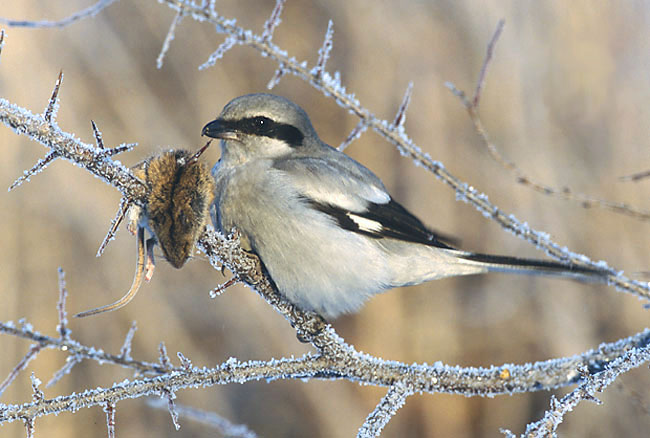
Northern shrike

Order: Passeriformes Family: Laniidae

Shrikes are passerine birds known for their habit of catching other birds and small animals and impaling the uneaten portions of their bodies on thorns. A shrike's beak is hooked, like that of a typical bird of prey.

- Brown shrike, Lanius cristatus (A) LC
- Red-backed shrike, Lanius collurio (A) LC
- Loggerhead shrike, Lanius ludovicianus (A) LC
- Northern shrike, Lanius borealis (Not yet assessed by the IUCN)

== Crows, jays, and magpies ==
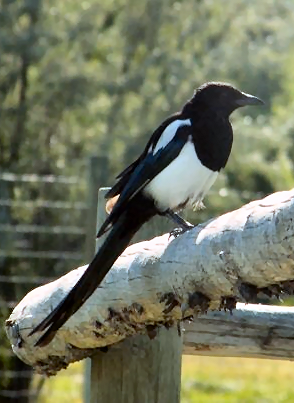
Black-billed magpie

Order: Passeriformes Family: Corvidae

The family Corvidae includes crows, ravens, jays, choughs, magpies, treepies, nutcrackers, and ground jays. Corvids are above average in size among the Passeriformes, and some of the larger species show high levels of intelligence.

- Canada jay, Perisoreus canadensis LC
- Pinyon jay, Gymnorhinus cyanocephalus (A) VU
- Steller's jay, Cyanocitta stelleri LC
- Blue jay, Cyanocitta cristata LC
- California scrub-jay, Aphelocoma californica (A) (not yet assessed by the IUCN)
- Clark's nutcracker, Nucifraga columbiana LC
- Black-billed magpie, Pica hudsonia LC
- American crow, Corvus brachyrhynchos LC
- Common raven, Corvus corax LC

== Tits, chickadees, and titmice ==
Order: Passeriformes Family: Paridae

The Paridae are mainly small stocky woodland species with short stout bills. Some have crests. They are adaptable birds, with a mixed diet including seeds and insects.

- Black-capped chickadee, Poecile atricapillus LC
- Mountain chickadee, Poecile gambeli LC
- Chestnut-backed chickadee, Poecile rufescens LC
- Boreal chickadee, Poecile hudsonica LC

== Larks ==
Order: Passeriformes Family: Alaudidae

Larks are small terrestrial birds with often extravagant songs and display flights. Most larks are fairly dull in appearance. Their food is insects and seeds.

- Eurasian skylark, Alauda arvensis (I) LC
- Horned lark, Eremophila alpestris LC

== Swallows ==
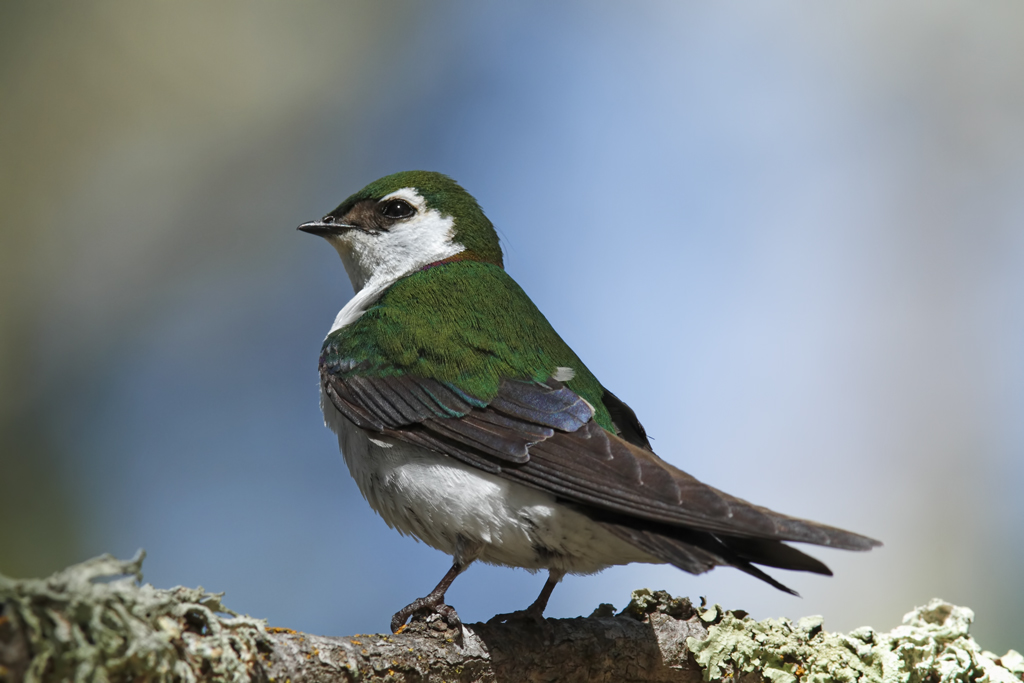
Violet-green swallow

Order: Passeriformes Family: Hirundinidae

The family Hirundinidae is adapted to aerial feeding. They have a slender streamlined body, long pointed wings, and a short bill with a wide gape. The feet are adapted to perching rather than walking, and the front toes are partially joined at the base.

- Bank swallow, Riparia riparia LC
- Tree swallow, Tachycineta bicolor LC
- Violet-green swallow, Tachycineta thalassina LC
- Northern rough-winged swallow, Stelgidopteryx serripennis LC
- Purple martin, Progne subis LC
- Barn swallow, Hirundo rustica LC
- Common house-martin, Delichon urbicum (A) LC
- Cliff swallow, Petrochelidon pyrrhonota LC
- Cave swallow, Petrochelidon fulva (A) LC

== Long-tailed tits ==
Order: Passeriformes Family: Aegithalidae

The long-tailed tits are a family of small passerine birds with medium to long tails. They make woven bag nests in trees. Most eat a mixed diet which includes insects.

- Bushtit, Psaltriparus minimus LC

== Leaf warblers ==
Order: Passeriformes Family: Phylloscopidae

Leaf warblers are a family of small insectivorous birds found mostly in Eurasia and ranging into Wallacea and Africa. The Arctic warbler breeds east into Alaska. The species are of various sizes, often green-plumaged above and yellow below, or more subdued with greyish-green to greyish-brown colours.

- Yellow-browed warbler, Phylloscopus inornatus (A) LC
- Dusky warbler, Phylloscopus fuscatus (A) (SR) LC

== Kinglets ==
Order: Passeriformes Family: Regulidae

The kinglets are a small family of birds which resemble the titmice. They are very small insectivorous birds. The adults have coloured crowns, giving rise to their name.

- Ruby-crowned kinglet, Corthylio calendula LC
- Golden-crowned kinglet, Regulus satrapa LC

== Waxwings ==
Order: Passeriformes Family: Bombycillidae

The waxwings are a group of passerine birds with soft silky plumage and unique red tips to some of the wing feathers. In the Bohemian and cedar waxwings, these tips look like sealing wax and give the group its name. These are arboreal birds of northern forests. They live on insects in summer and berries in winter.

- Bohemian waxwing, Bombycilla garrulus LC
- Cedar waxwing, Bombycilla cedrorum LC

== Silky-flycatchers ==
Order: Passeriformes Family: Ptiliogonatidae

The silky-flycatchers are a small family of passerine birds which occur mainly in Central America. They are related to waxwings and most species have small crests.

- Phainopepla, Phainopepla nitens (A) (SR) LC

== Nuthatches ==
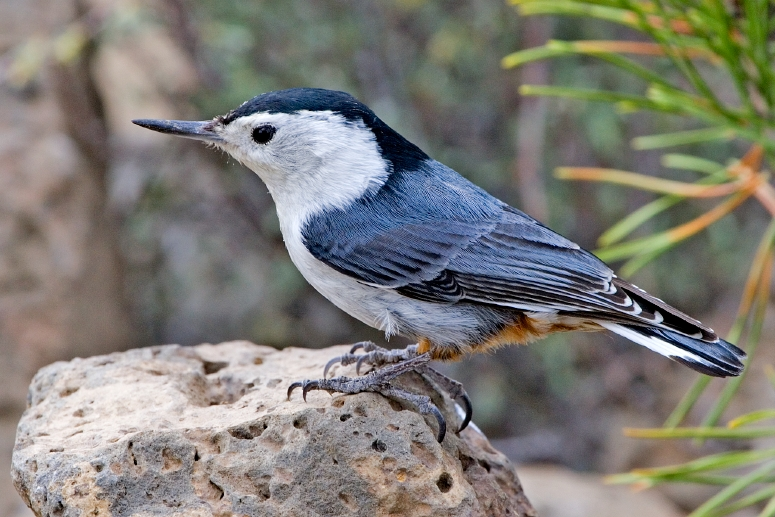
White-breasted nuthatch

Order: Passeriformes Family: Sittidae

Nuthatches are small woodland birds. They have the unusual ability to climb down trees head first, unlike other birds which can only go upwards. Nuthatches have big heads, short tails and powerful bills and feet.

- Red-breasted nuthatch, Sitta canadensis LC
- White-breasted nuthatch, Sitta carolinensis LC
- Pygmy nuthatch, Sitta pygmaea LC

== Treecreepers ==
Order: Passeriformes Family: Certhiidae

Treecreepers are small woodland birds, brown above and white below. They have thin pointed down-curved bills, which they use to extricate insects from bark. They have stiff tail feathers, like woodpeckers, which they use to support themselves on vertical trees.

- Brown creeper, Certhia americana LC

== Gnatcatchers ==
Order: Passeriformes Family: Polioptilidae

These dainty birds resemble Old World warblers in their structure and habits, moving restlessly through the foliage seeking insects. The gnatcatchers are mainly soft bluish grey in colour and have the typical insectivore's long sharp bill. Many species have distinctive black head patterns (especially males) and long, regularly cocked, black-and-white tails.

- Blue-grey gnatcatcher, Polioptila caerulea (A) LC

== Wrens ==
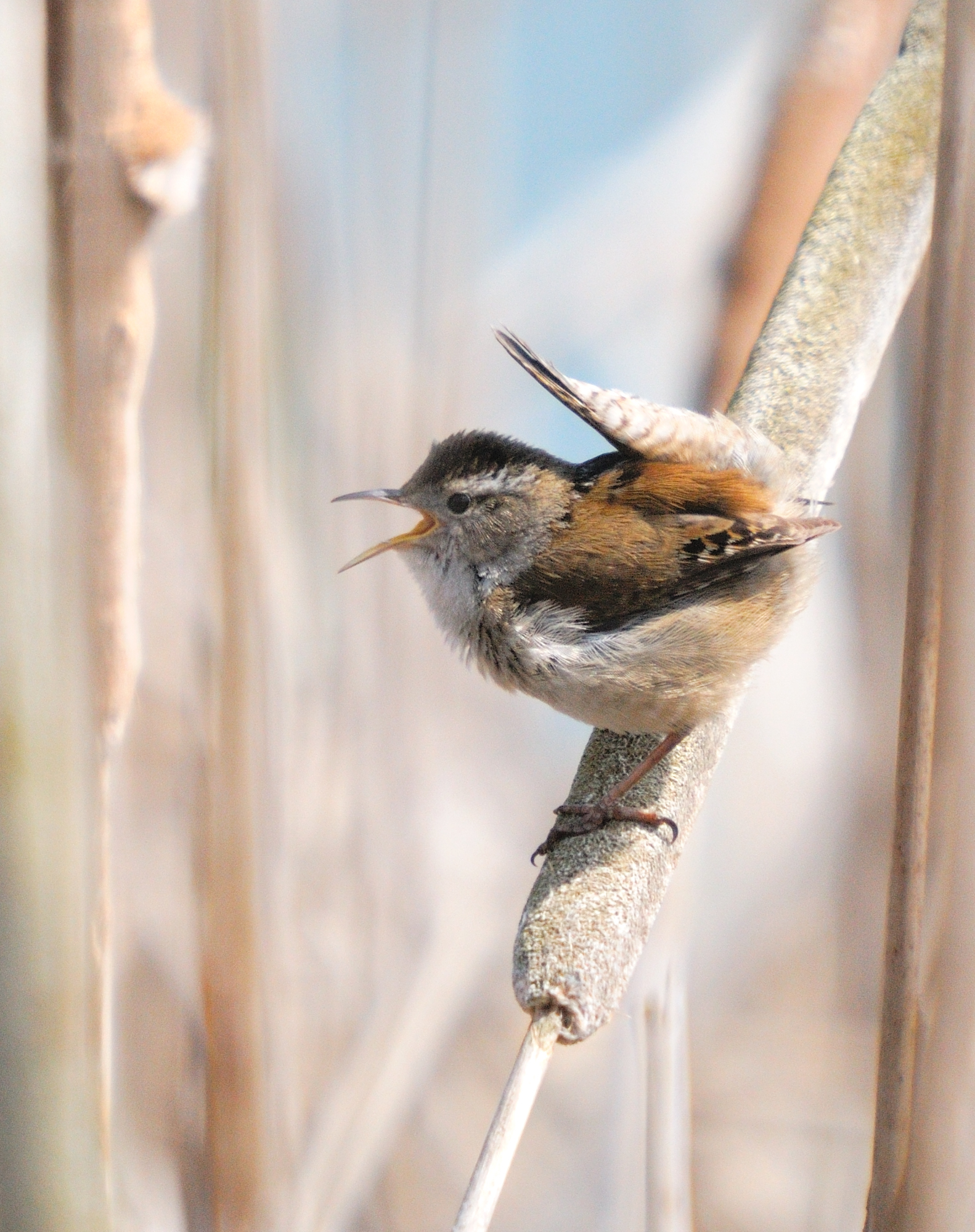
Marsh wren

Order: Passeriformes Family: Troglodytidae

Wrens are small and inconspicuous birds, except for their loud songs. They have short wings and thin down-turned bills. Several species often hold their tails upright. All are insectivorous.

- Rock wren, Salpinctes obsoletus LC
- Canyon wren, Catherpes mexicanus LC
- House wren, Troglodytes aedon LC
- Pacific wren, Troglodytes pacificus LC
- Winter wren, Troglodytes hiemalis LC
- Sedge wren, Cistothorus platensis (A) LC
- Marsh wren, Cistothorus palustris LC
- Bewick's wren, Thryomanes bewickii LC

== Mockingbirds and thrashers ==
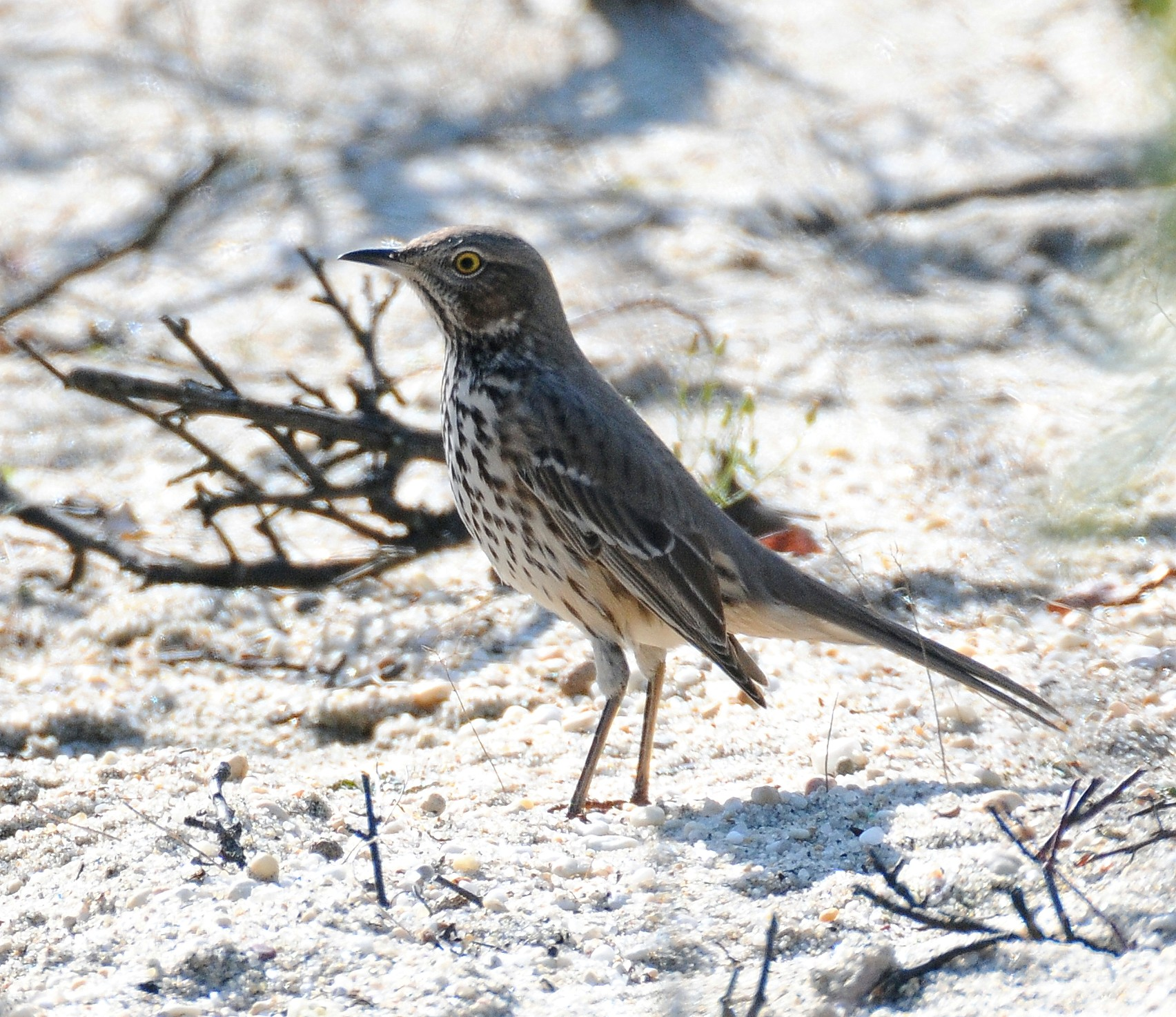
Sage thrasher

Order: Passeriformes Family: Mimidae

The mimids are a family of passerine birds which includes thrashers, mockingbirds, tremblers, and the New World catbirds. These birds are notable for their vocalization, especially their remarkable ability to mimic a wide variety of birds and other sounds heard outdoors. The species tend towards dull greys and browns in their appearance.

- Grey catbird, Dumetella carolinensis LC
- Curve-billed thrasher, Toxostoma curvirostre (A) LC
- Brown thrasher, Toxostoma rufum (A) LC
- Sage thrasher, Oreoscoptes montanus LC
- Northern mockingbird, Mimus polyglottos LC

== Starlings ==
Order: Passeriformes Family: Sturnidae

Starlings and mynas are small to medium-sized Old World passerine birds with strong feet. Their flight is strong and direct and most are very gregarious. Their preferred habitat is fairly open country, and they eat insects and fruit. The plumage of several species is dark with a metallic sheen.

- European starling, Sturnus vulgaris (I) LC
- Crested myna, Acridotheres cristatellus (I) (Extirpated) (Not on the AOS Check-list) LC

== Dippers ==
Order: Passeriformes Family: Cinclidae

Dippers are a group of perching birds whose habitat includes aquatic environments in the Americas, Europe, and Asia. They are named for their bobbing or dipping movements. These birds have adaptations which allows them to submerge and walk on the bottom to feed on insect larvae.

- American dipper, Cinclus mexicanus LC

== Thrushes and allies ==
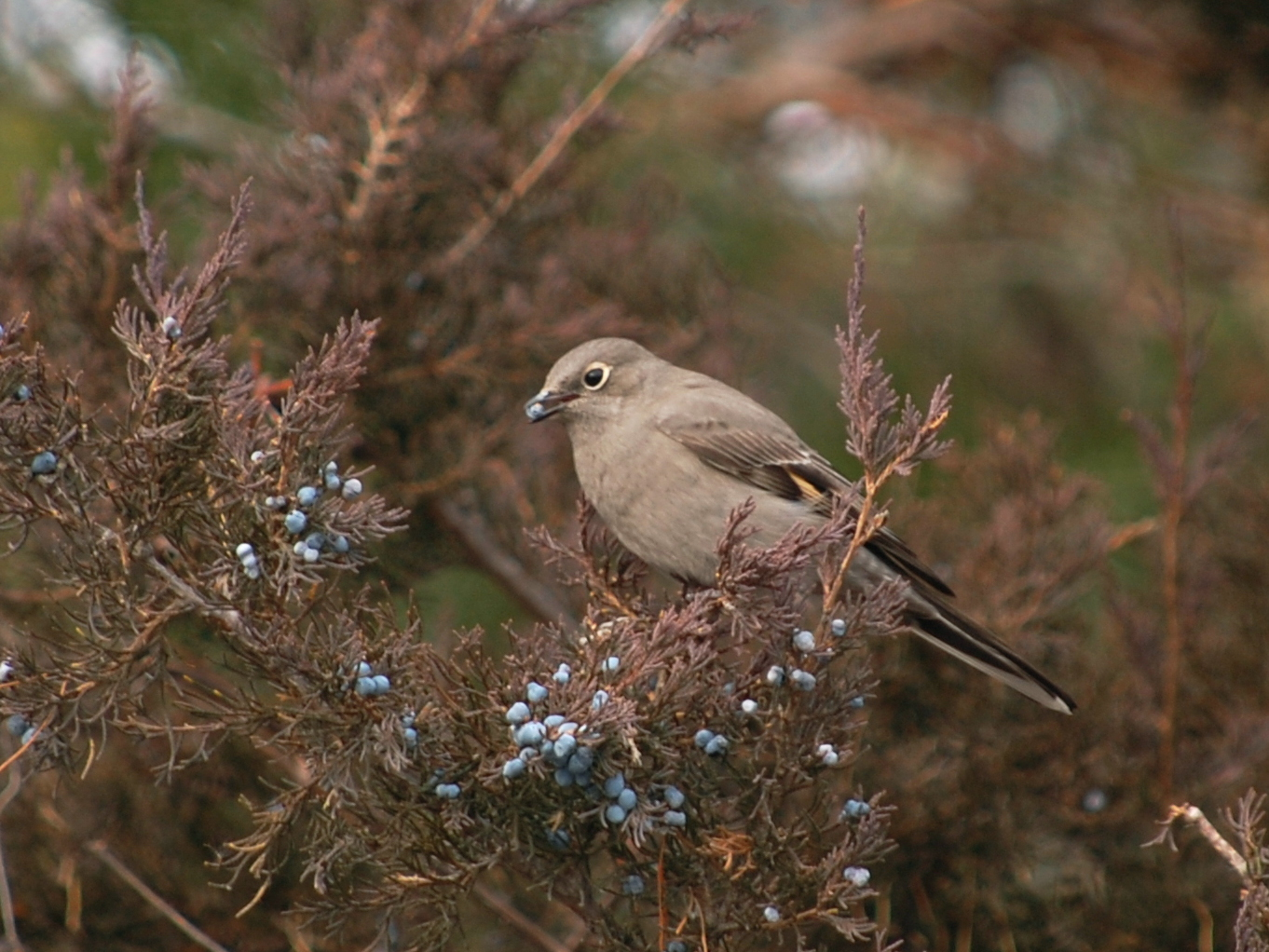
Townsend's solitaire

Order: Passeriformes Family: Turdidae

The thrushes are a group of passerine birds that occur mainly but not exclusively in the Old World. They are plump, soft plumaged, small to medium-sized insectivores or sometimes omnivores, often feeding on the ground. Many have attractive songs.

- Eastern bluebird, Sialia sialis (A) LC
- Western bluebird, Sialia mexicana LC
- Mountain bluebird, Sialia currucoides LC
- Townsend's solitaire, Myadestes townsendi LC
- Veery, Catharus fuscescens LC
- Grey-cheeked thrush, Catharus minimus LC
- Swainson's thrush, Catharus ustulatus LC
- Hermit thrush, Catharus guttatus LC
- Wood thrush, Hylocichla mustelina (A) NT
- Eyebrowed thrush, Turdus obscurus (A) (SR) LC
- Dusky thrush, Turdus eunomus (A) LC
- Fieldfare, Turdus pilaris (A) LC
- Redwing, Turdus iliacus (A) NT
- American robin, Turdus migratorius LC
- Varied thrush, Ixoreus naevius LC

== Old World flycatchers ==
Order: Passeriformes Family: Muscicapidae

The Old World flycatchers are a large family of small passerine birds. These are mainly small arboreal insectivores, many of which, as the name implies, take their prey on the wing.

- Blue rock-thrush, Monticola solitarius (A) (Not on the AOS Check-list) LC
- Red-flanked bluetail, Tarsiger cyanurus (A) LC
- Siberian stonechat, Saxicola maurus (A) (H) (Not on the AOS Check-list)
- Northern wheatear, Oenanthe oenanthe (A) LC

== Accentors ==
Order: Passeriformes Family: Prunellidae

Accentors are small, fairly drab species superficially similar, but unrelated to, sparrows. However, accentors have thin sharp bills, reflecting their diet of insects in summer, augmented with seeds and berries in winter.

- Siberian accentor, Prunella montanella (A) LC

== Old World sparrows ==
Order: Passeriformes Family: Passeridae

Old World sparrows are small passerine birds. In general, sparrows tend to be small plump brownish or greyish birds with short tails and short powerful beaks. Sparrows are seed eaters, but they also consume small insects.

- House sparrow, Passer domesticus (I) LC

== Wagtails and pipits ==
Order: Passeriformes Family: Motacillidae

Motacillidae is a family of small passerine birds with medium to long tails. They include the wagtails, longclaws and pipits. They are slender ground-feeding insectivores of open country.

- Eastern yellow wagtail, Motacilla tschutschensis (A) LC
- Citrine wagtail, Motacilla citreola (A) LC
- Grey wagtail, Motacilla cinerea (A) LC
- White wagtail, Motacilla alba (A) LC
- Red-throated pipit, Anthus cervinus (A) LC
- American pipit, Anthus rubescens LC
- Sprague's pipit, Anthus spragueii (A) VU

== Finches, euphonias, and allies ==
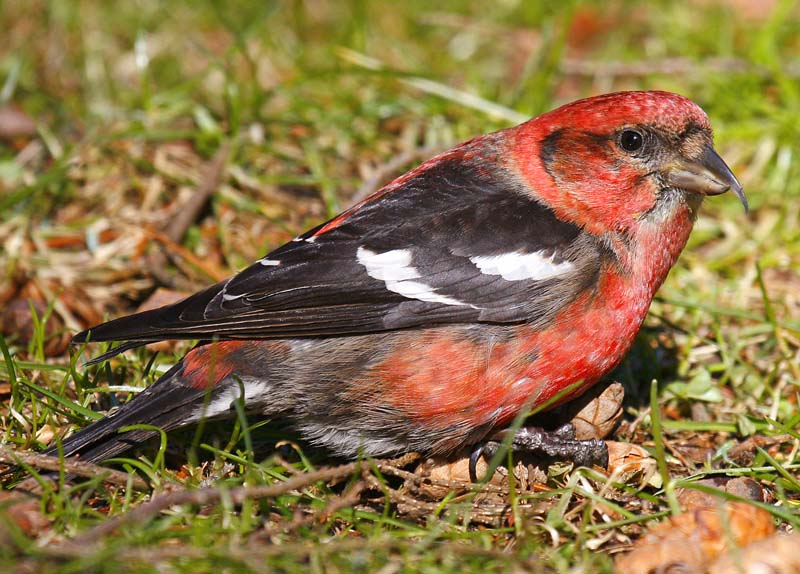
White-winged crossbill

Order: Passeriformes Family: Fringillidae

Finches are seed-eating passerine birds, that are small to moderately large and have a strong beak, usually conical and in some species very large. All have twelve tail feathers and nine primaries. These birds have a bouncing flight with alternating bouts of flapping and gliding on closed wings, and most sing well.

- Brambling, Fringilla montifringilla (A) LC
- Evening grosbeak, Coccothraustes vespertinus LC
- Pine grosbeak, Pinicola enucleator LC
- Grey-crowned rosy-finch, Leucosticte tephrocotis LC
- Purple finch, Haemorhous purpureus LC
- Cassin's finch, Haemorhous cassinii NT
- House finch, Haemorhous mexicanus LC
- Common redpoll, Acanthis flammea LC
- Hoary redpoll, Acanthis hornemanni
- Red crossbill, Loxia curvirostra LC
- White-winged crossbill, Loxia leucoptera LC
- Pine siskin, Spinus pinus LC
- Lesser goldfinch, Spinus psaltria (A) LC
- American goldfinch, Spinus tristis LC
- Oriental greenfinch, Chloris sinica (A) LC

== Longspurs and snow buntings ==
Order: Passeriformes Family: Calcariidae

The Calcariidae are a group of passerine birds that were traditionally grouped with the New World sparrows, but differ in a number of respects and are usually found in open grassy areas.

- Lapland longspur, Calcarius lapponicus LC
- Chestnut-collared longspur, Calcarius ornatus (A) NT
- Smith's longspur, Calcarius pictus LC
- Thick-billed longspur, Rhynchophanes mccownii (A) LC
- Snow bunting, Plectrophenax nivalis LC
- McKay's bunting, Plectrophenax hyperboreus (A) LC

== Old World buntings ==
Order: Passeriformes Family: Emberizidae

Emberizidae is a family of passerine birds containing a single genus. Until 2017, the New World sparrows (Passerellidae) were also considered part of this family.

- Pine bunting, Emberiza leucocephalos (A) LC
- Little bunting, Emberiza pusilla (A) LC
- Rustic bunting, Emberiza rustica (A) VU

== New World sparrows ==
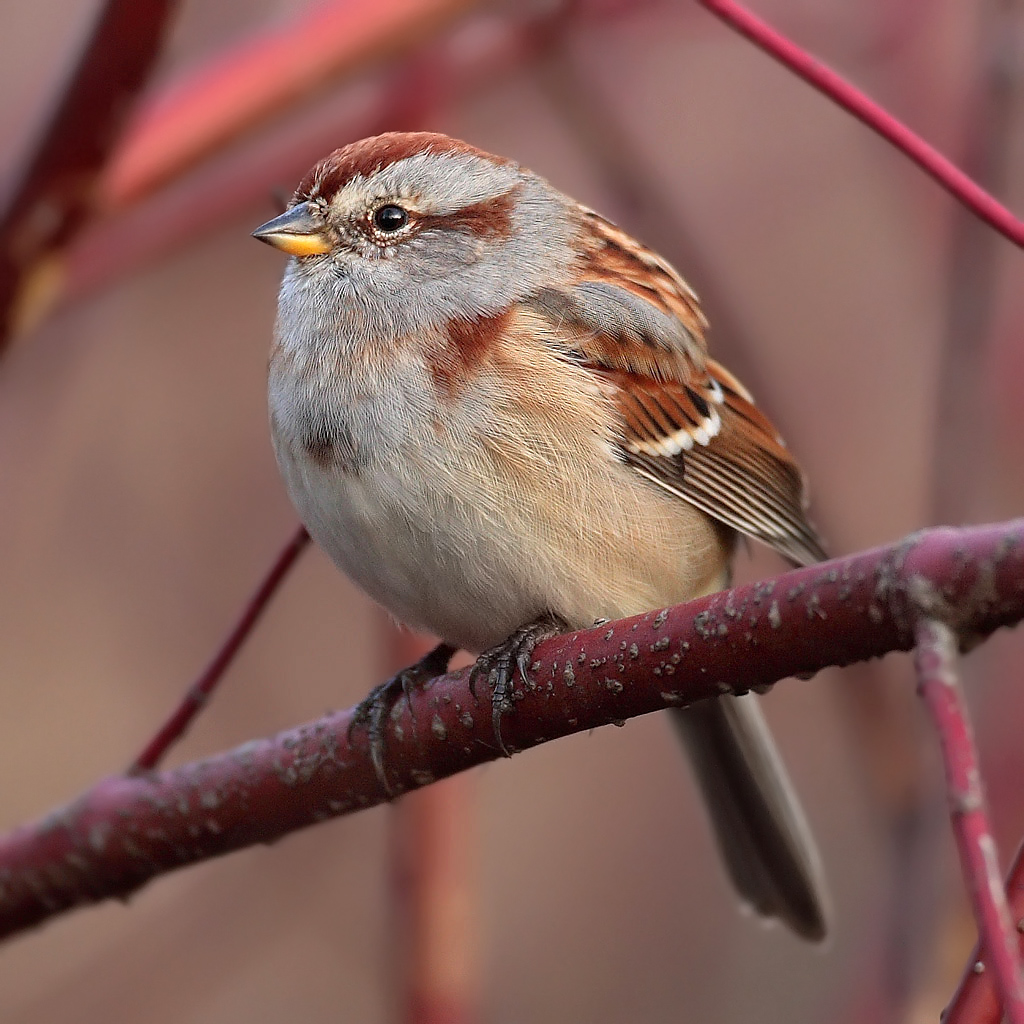
American tree sparrow

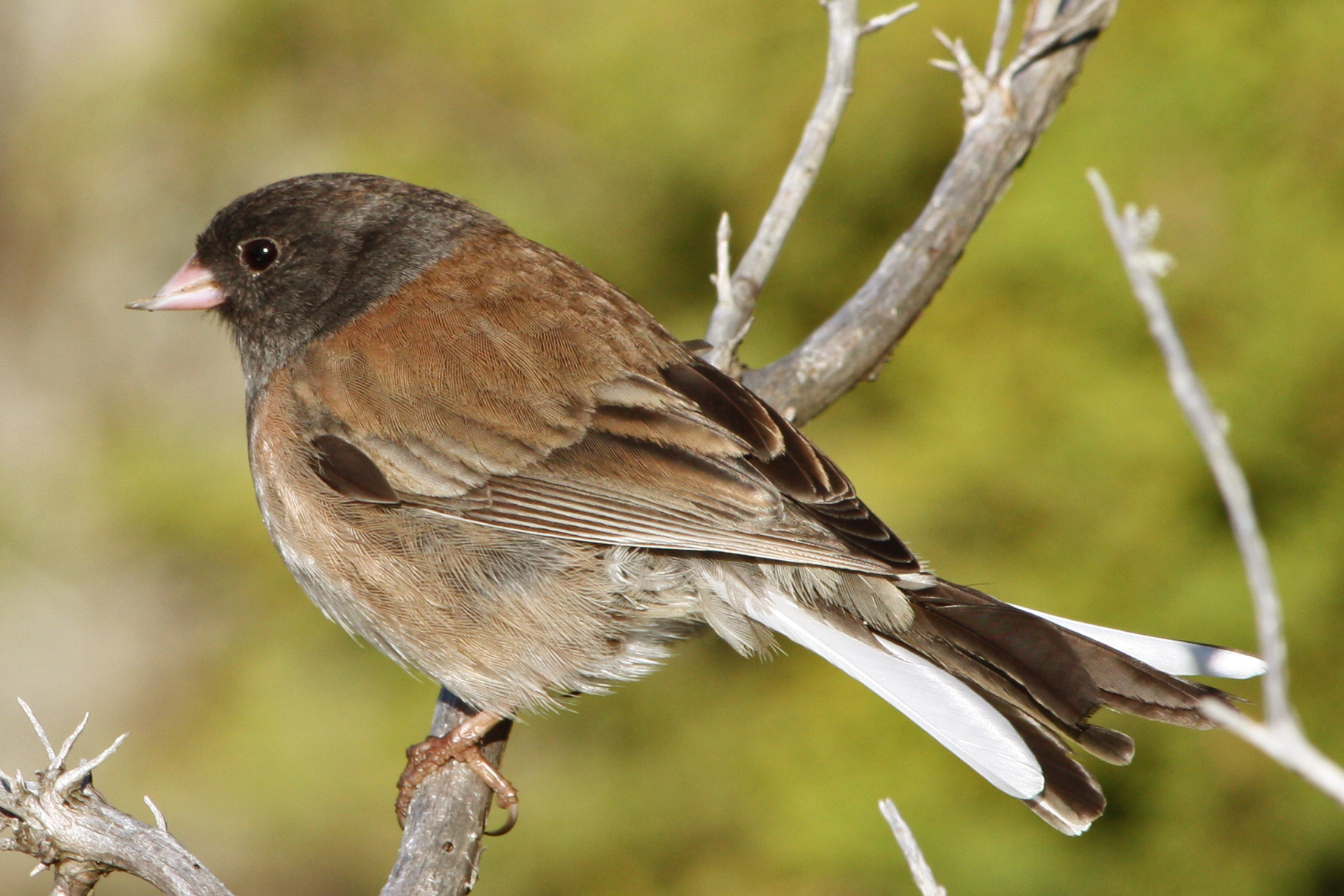
Dark-eyed junco

Order: Passeriformes Family: Passerellidae

Until 2017, these species were considered part of the family Emberizidae. Most of the species are known as sparrows, but these birds are not closely related to the Old World sparrows which are in the family Passeridae. Many of these have distinctive head patterns.

- Grasshopper sparrow, Ammodramus savannarum LC
- Black-throated sparrow, Amphispiza bilineata (A) LC
- Lark sparrow, Chondestes grammacus LC
- Lark bunting, Calamospiza melanocorys (A) LC
- Chipping sparrow, Spizella passerina LC
- Clay-coloured sparrow, Spizella pallida LC
- Field sparrow, Spizella pusilla (A) LC
- Brewer's sparrow, Spizella breweri LC
- Fox sparrow, Passerella iliaca LC
- American tree sparrow, Spizelloides arborea LC
- Dark-eyed junco, Junco hyemalis LC
- White-crowned sparrow, Zonotrichia leucophrys LC
- Golden-crowned sparrow, Zonotrichia atricapilla LC
- Harris's sparrow, Zonotrichia querula NT
- White-throated sparrow, Zonotrichia albicollis LC
- Sagebrush sparrow, Artemisiospiza nevadensis (A) LC
- Bell's sparrow, Artemisiospiza belli (A) LC
- Vesper sparrow, Pooecetes gramineus LC
- LeConte's sparrow, Ammospiza leconteii LC
- Nelson's sparrow, Ammospiza nelsoni LC
- Baird's sparrow, Centronyx bairdii (A) (H) LC
- Savannah sparrow, Passerculus sandwichensis LC
- Song sparrow, Melospiza melodia LC
- Lincoln's sparrow, Melospiza lincolnii LC
- Swamp sparrow, Melospiza georgiana LC
- Green-tailed towhee, Pipilo chlorurus (A) LC
- Spotted towhee, Pipilo maculatus LC
- Eastern towhee, Pipilo erythrophthalmus (A) (H) LC

== Yellow-breasted chat ==
Order: Passeriformes Family: Icteriidae

This species was historically placed in the wood-warblers (Parulidae) but nonetheless most authorities were unsure if it belonged there. It was placed in its own family in 2017.

- Yellow-breasted chat, Icteria virens

== Troupials and allies ==
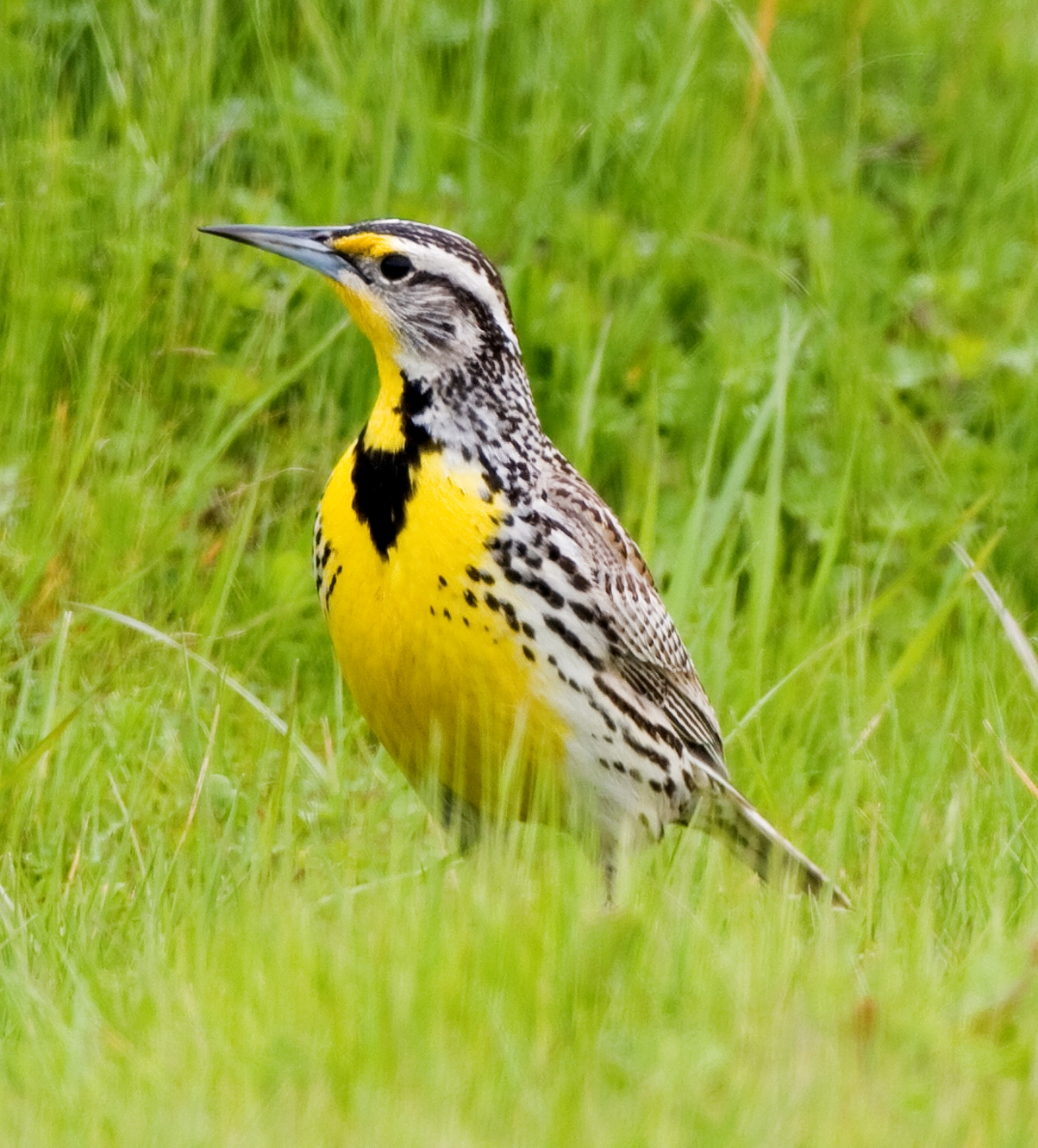
Western meadowlark

Order: Passeriformes Family: Icteridae

The icterids are a group of small to medium-sized, often colourful passerine birds restricted to the New World and include the grackles, New World blackbirds, and New World orioles. Most species have black as a predominant plumage colour, often enlivened by yellow, orange, or red.

- Yellow-headed blackbird, Xanthocephalus xanthocephalus LC
- Bobolink, Dolichonyx oryzivorus LC
- Western meadowlark, Sturnella neglecta LC
- Orchard oriole, Icterus spurius (A) LC
- Hooded oriole, Icterus cucullatus (A) LC
- Bullock's oriole, Icterus bullockii LC
- Baltimore oriole, Icterus galbula LC
- Scott's oriole, Icterus parisorum (A) (H) LC
- Red-winged blackbird, Agelaius phoeniceus LC
- Brown-headed cowbird, Molothrus ater LC
- Rusty blackbird, Euphagus carolinus VU
- Brewer's blackbird, Euphagus cyanocephalus LC
- Common grackle, Quiscalus quiscula NT
- Great-tailed grackle, Quiscalus mexicanus (A) LC

== New World warblers ==
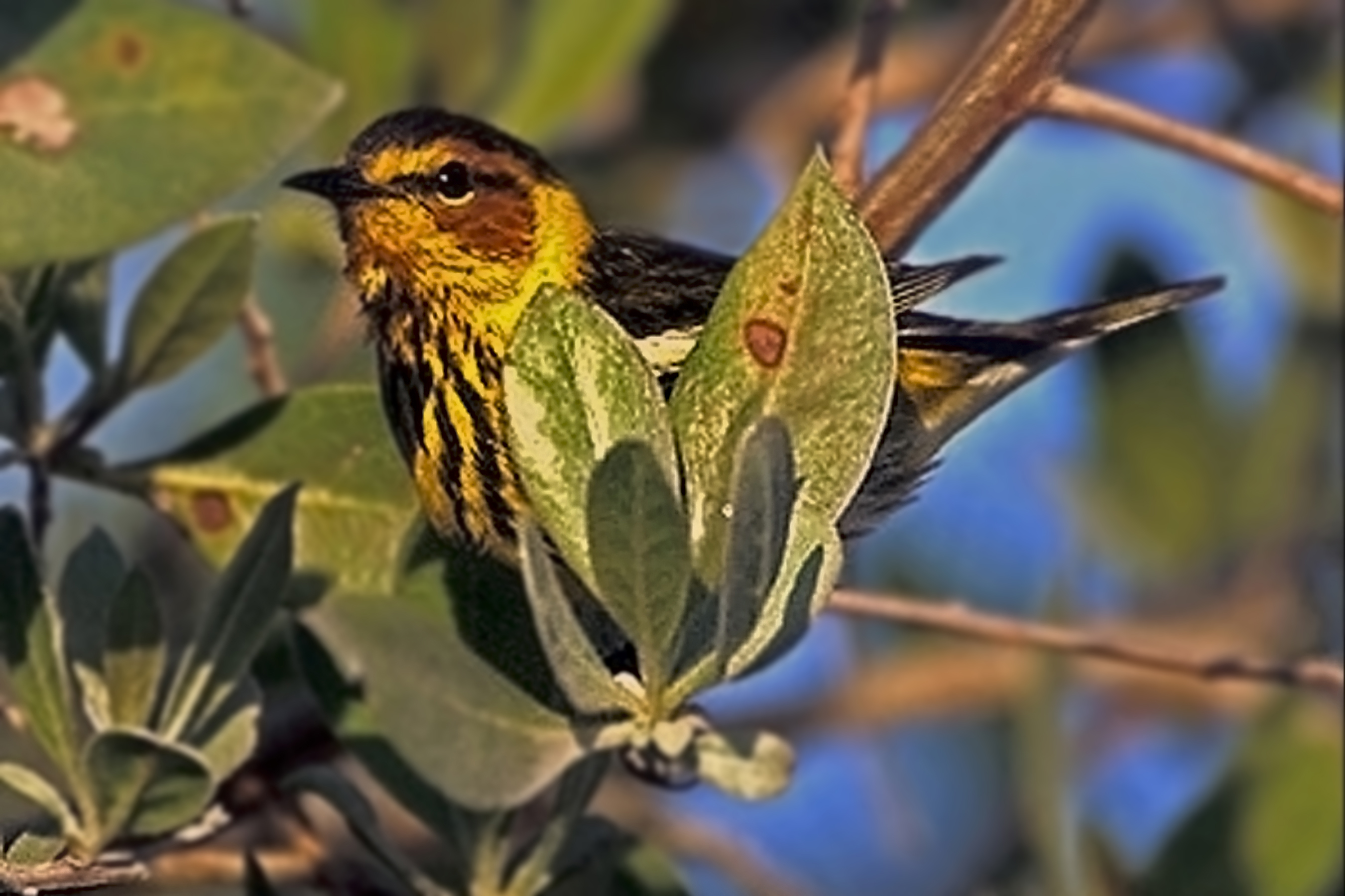
Cape May warbler

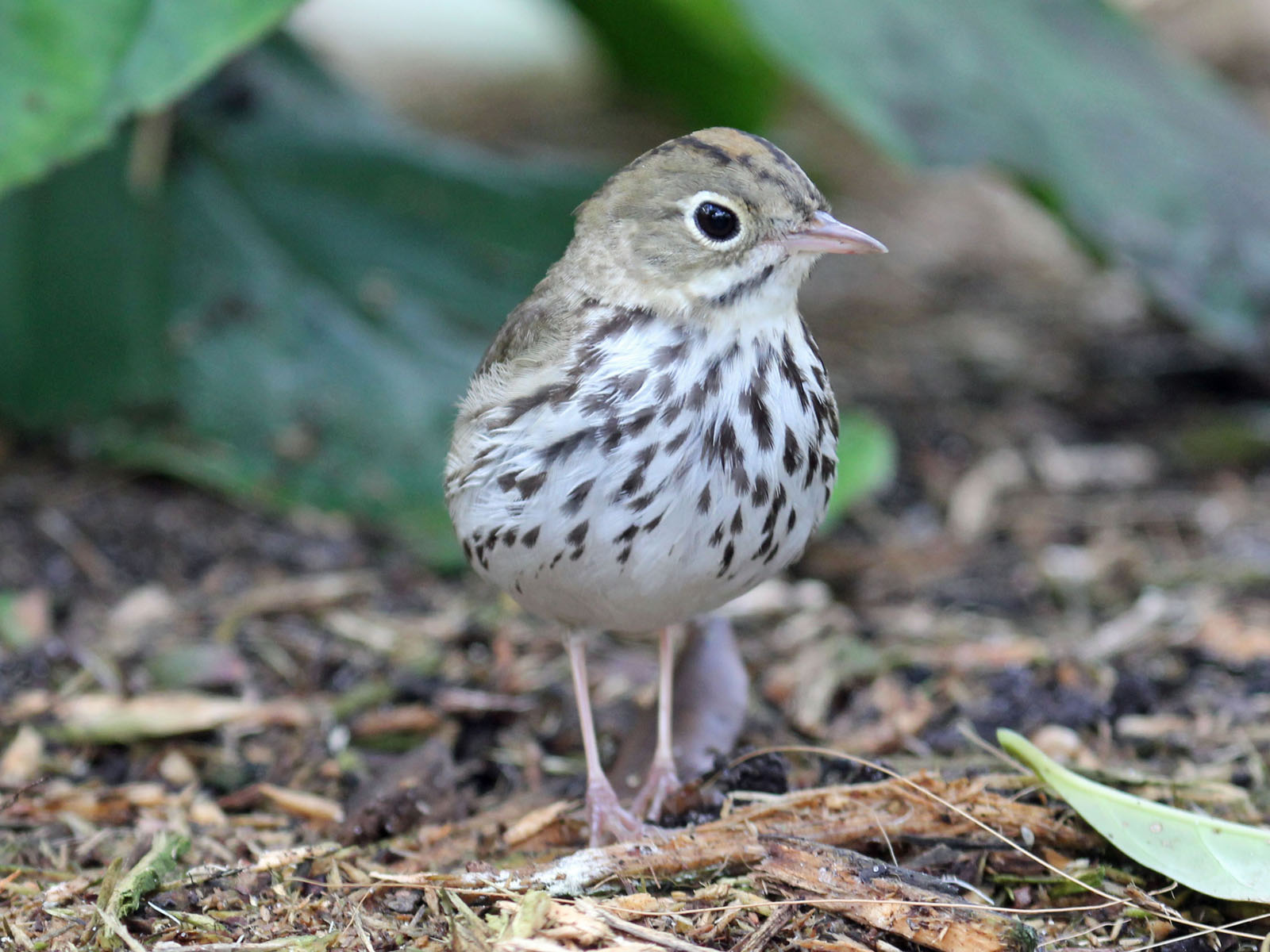
Ovenbird

Order: Passeriformes Family: Parulidae

The wood-warblers are a group of small, often colourful, passerine birds restricted to the New World. Most are arboreal, but some are more terrestrial. Most members of this family are insectivores.

- Ovenbird, Seiurus aurocapilla LC
- Northern waterthrush, Parkesia noveboracensis LC
- Golden-winged warbler, Vermivora chrysoptera (A) NT
- Blue-winged warbler, Vermivora cyanoptera (A) (SR) LC
- Black-and-white warbler, Mniotilta varia LC
- Prothonotary warbler, Protonotaria citrea (A) LC
- Tennessee warbler, Leiothlypis peregrina LC
- Orange-crowned warbler, Leiothlypis celata LC
- Lucy's warbler, Leiothlypis luciae (A) LC
- Nashville warbler, Leiothlypis ruficapilla LC
- Virginia's warbler, Leiothlypis virginiae (A) (SR) LC
- Connecticut warbler, Oporornis agilis LC
- MacGillivray's warbler, Geothlypis tolmiei LC
- Mourning warbler, Geothlypis philadelphia LC
- Kentucky warbler, Geothlypis formosa (A) (SR) LC
- Common yellowthroat, Geothlypis trichas LC
- Hooded warbler, Setophaga citrina (A) LC
- American redstart, Setophaga ruticilla LC
- Cape May warbler, Setophaga tigrina LC
- Cerulean warbler, Setophaga cerulea (A) (SR) VU
- Northern parula, Setophaga americana (A) LC
- Magnolia warbler, Setophaga magnolia LC
- Bay-breasted warbler, Setophaga castanea LC
- Blackburnian warbler, Setophaga fusca (A) LC
- Yellow warbler, Setophaga petechia LC
- Chestnut-sided warbler, Setophaga pensylvanica (A) LC
- Blackpoll warbler, Setophaga striata LC
- Black-throated blue warbler, Setophaga caerulescens (A) LC
- Palm warbler, Setophaga palmarum LC
- Pine warbler, Setophaga pinus (A) LC
- Yellow-rumped warbler, Setophaga coronata LC
- Yellow-throated warbler, Setophaga dominica (A) LC
- Prairie warbler, Setophaga discolor (A) LC
- Black-throated grey warbler, Setophaga nigrescens LC
- Townsend's warbler, Setophaga townsendi LC
- Hermit warbler, Setophaga occidentalis (A) LC
- Black-throated green warbler, Setophaga virens LC
- Canada warbler, Cardellina canadensis LC
- Wilson's warbler, Cardellina pusilla LC
- Painted redstart, Myioborus pictus (A) LC

== Cardinals and allies ==
Order: Passeriformes Family: Cardinalidae

The cardinals are a family of robust, seed-eating birds with strong bills. They are typically associated with open woodland. The sexes usually have distinct plumages.

- Summer tanager, Piranga rubra (A) LC
- Scarlet tanager, Piranga olivacea (A) LC
- Western tanager, Piranga ludoviciana LC
- Northern cardinal, Cardinalis cardinalis (A) (H) LC
- Yellow grosbeak, Pheucticus chrysopeplus (A) (OU) LC
- Rose-breasted grosbeak, Pheucticus ludovicianus LC
- Black-headed grosbeak, Pheucticus melanocephalus LC
- Blue grosbeak, Passerina caerulea (A) LC
- Lazuli bunting, Passerina amoena LC
- Indigo bunting, Passerina cyanea (A) LC
- Painted bunting, Passerina ciris (A) LC
- Dickcissel, Spiza americana (A) LC
