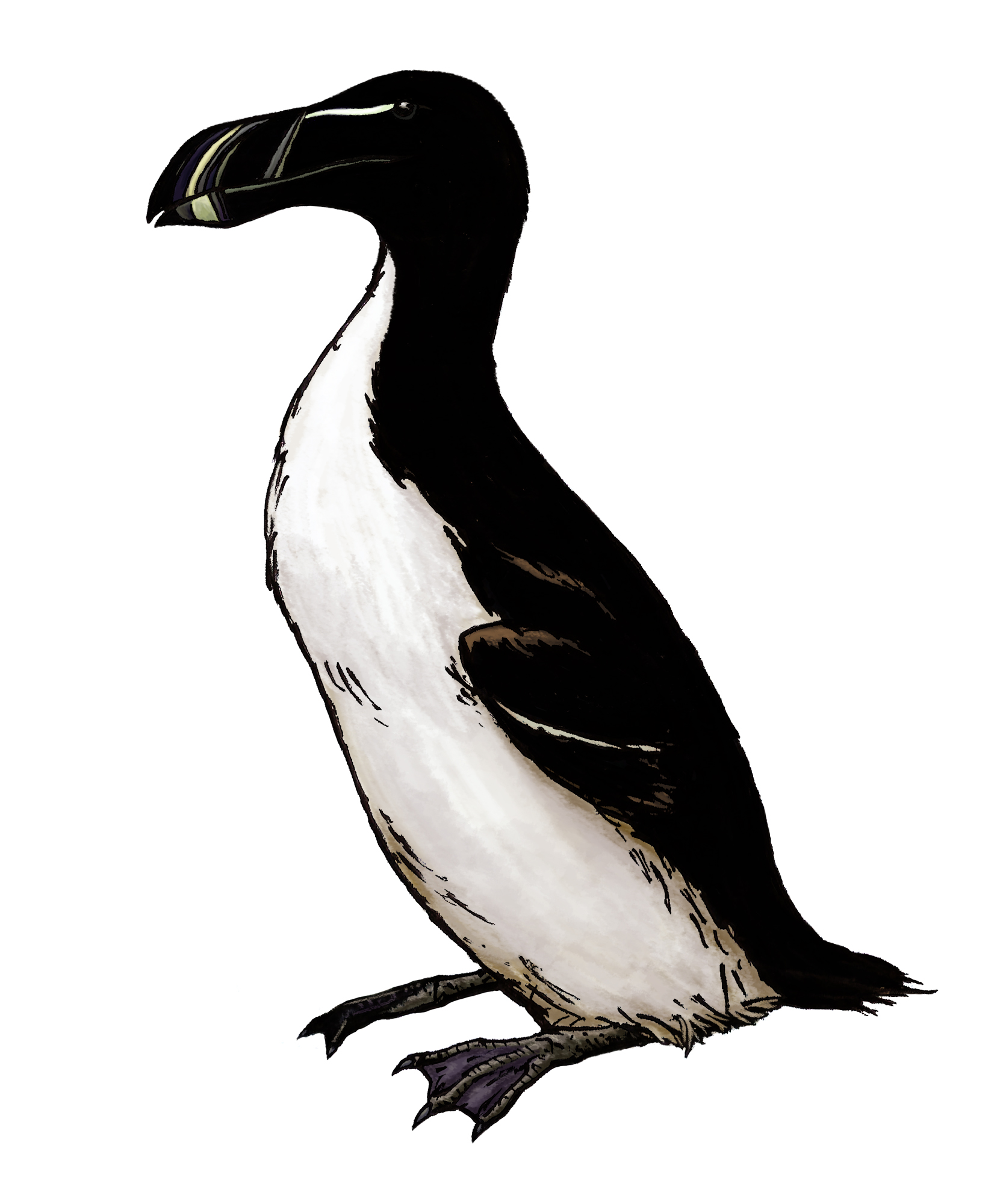
- Life restoration

Scientific classification
- Kingdom: Animalia
- Phylum: Chordata
- Class: Aves
- Order: Charadriiformes
- Family: Alcidae
- Genus: †Pinguinus
- Species: †P. alfrednewtoni

Binomial name
- †Pinguinus alfrednewtoni Olson, 1977

= Pinguinus alfrednewtoni =

Pinguinus alfrednewtoni Temporal range: Pliocene

Extinct species of bird

Pinguinus alfrednewtoni is an extinct species of auk related to the great auk known from fossils that were discovered in the Pliocene Yorktown Formation of North Carolina. Like the great auk, it was a large flightless diving bird that used its wings to propel itself forward underwater. Only a limited amount of material is known, despite the rich diversity of fossil auks recovered from the Yorktown Formation. Due to this, it has been proposed that it was either a more coastal animal or simply not as common in more southern waters. This later suggestion could be supported by the discovery of relatively young P. alfrednewtoni remains, indicating that they may have overwintered in the region. One early hypothesis proposed that it was a direct ancestor to the great auk, but this idea is no longer supported. Instead, it is thought that it filled the same niche as its eastern relative, which eventually expanded into the western Atlantic after the extinction of P. alfrednewtoni.

== History and naming ==
The fossils of Pinguinus alfrednewtoni were discovered in the Lee Creek phosphate mines of the Yorktown Formation in North Carolina. Of the thousands of alcid bones recovered from the locality, six were identified as having belonged to a species of the genus Pinguinus by ornithologist Storrs Olson, who proceeded to assign them to a new species. A large and heavy ulna served as the holotype, while the remaining fossils (including a femur, two humeri and some other leg bones) were designated as the paratypes. Remains of this species have however remained rare and since this initial discovery only approximately 20 specimens have been collected, which are generally isolated and fragmentary. These additional specimens are primarily composed of more limb material, but also includes coracoids, scapulae and a part of the skull.

The species was named after Alfred Newton, a British zoologist and ornithologist as well as founding member of the British Ornithologists' Union. In addition to honoring Newton for his work in ornithology in general, Olson notes Newton's passion for the great auk specifically.

== Description ==
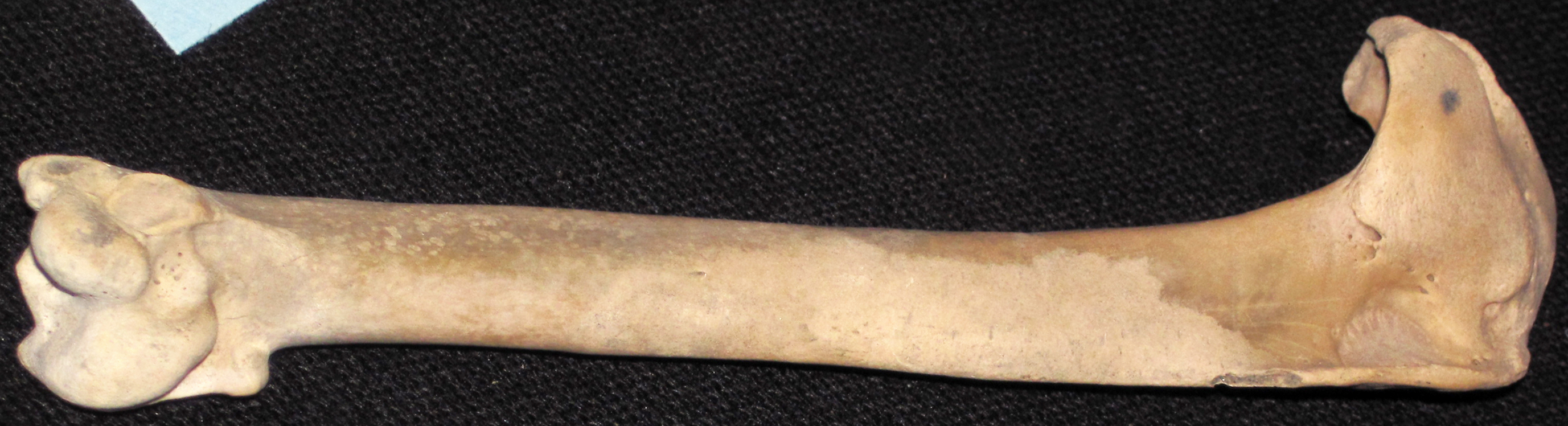
Left humerus collected in 1990

Pinguinus alfrednewtoni was a large species of auk and among the largest members of its family. The ulna of this bird is massive, but can be distinguished from the distantly related, also flightless members of Mancallinae by being proportionally longer. The fact that the ulna is shorter than the femur allows it to be identified as a species of Pinguinus. However, there are enough differences to clearly separate it from Pinguinus impennis. Notably, the ulna isn't as compressed as in the more recent form and shows a greater curvature to its shaft, while both the external and internal cotyla are wider in proximal view. The distal tendinal groove runs almost perpendicular to the shaft of the bone at a 70° angle, whereas the same element in the great auk runs at a 45° angle. Although this is among the more minor differences, it may still be significant for the animal's lifestyle. The same lack of compression observed in the ulna also applies to the humerus, which is likewise less flattened than in great auks. The proximal end of the humerus, as is the case in the ulna, is heavier and more rounded, while the distal end appears to be less rounded with thinner bone walls. The head of the femur, which fits into the hip joint, is smaller than in the more recent great auk. The tarsometatarsi, unlike the rest of the skeleton, are described as being longer and more gracile than those of the great auk. Overall, the proportions greatly resemble Pinguinus impennis, with the differences in the wing bones indicating that P. alfrednewtoni was a slightly less specialised animal compared to its Pleistocene relative.

The fossil material of P. alfrednewtoni generally falls within the size range of the great auk, making it one of the biggest known auks. In 2001, Olson and Rasmussen wrote that P. alfrednewtoni was larger and heavier than the great auk, in part due to having heavier bones. However, a more recent study by N. A. Smith recovered P. alfrednewtoni as being slightly smaller than P. impennis. Smith lists the largest humerus and femur as being 101 mm (4.0 in) and 71.1 mm (2.80 in) long respectively, which is congruent with the largest specimens reported by Olson (1977) and Olson & Rasmussen (2001). Smith's calculations would indicate that P. alfrednewtoni reached a weight of 4.608 kg (10.16 lb), compared to the 4.750 kg (10.47 lb) recovered for P. impennis.

== Phylogeny ==
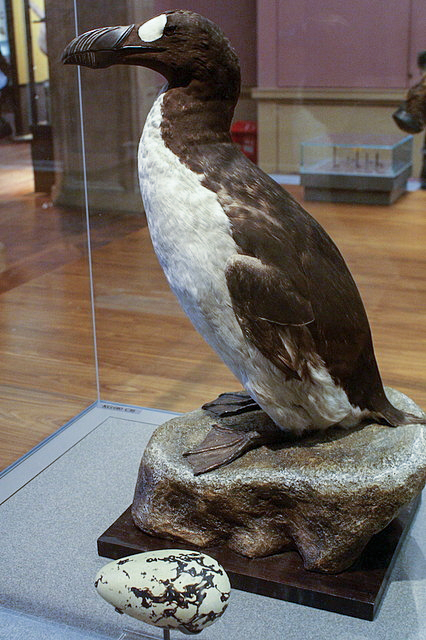
A great auk (Pinguinus impennis), of which species P. impennis was the closest known relative.

Although P. alfrednewtoni had been considered a sister taxon to the more recent great auk since its description in the 70s, it and many other extinct auks had not been included in phylogenetic analysis until 2011. The results derived from this analysis confirmed its placement in Pinguinus and relationship to the great auk. A later publication by Smith also followed this placement, the resulting phylogenetic tree is depicted below.

- - Pan‑Alcidae
    - †Lucas Auks
    - Alcidae
      - Fraterculinae
        - Fraterculini
          - Rhinoceros auklet
          - Puffins
        - Aethiini
          - †Aethia storeri
          - - Cassin's auklet
            - Aethia auklets
      - Alcinae
        - Brachyramphine murrelets
        - - Cepphus
          - - Synthliboramphine murrelets
            - Alcini
              - - Uria
                - Alle (Little auk; including Miocepphus)
              - - - †Pinguinus alfrednewtoni
                  - †Pinguinus impennis (Great auk)
                - Alca (Razorbill)

== Evolution ==
Being a member of the alcid crown group, Pinguinus alfrednewtoni and other members of Pinguinus evolved their large body size independently from the earlier Lucas auks of the Mancallinae, while also independently losing their ability to fly. Although some researchers draw parallels to penguins, Smith urges against direct comparison between these phylogenetically distant groups. Smith suggests that the large size obtained by some lineages of auks including Pinguinus alfrednewtoni are the result of these animals no longer being constrained by the need to remain light enough to stay volant, allowing them to grow much larger than their flying relatives.

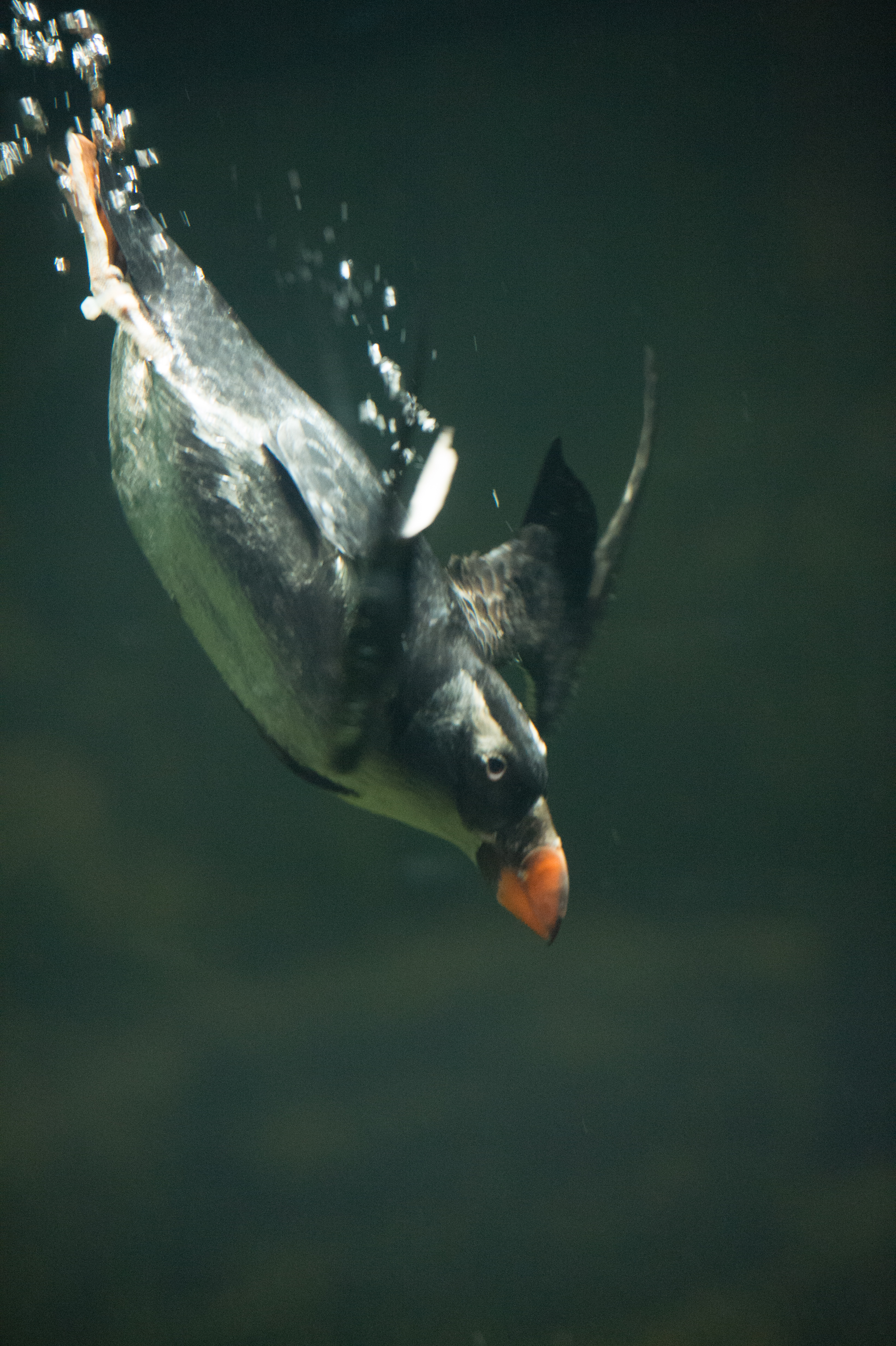
Like modern auks (including the Tufted Puffin), P. alfrednewtoni employed its wings as paddles while diving.

One early hypothesis for the evolutionary importance of P. alfrednewtoni was that it may have been a direct ancestor to P. impennis, as proposed in early works by Olson. However, a later study by Olson and Rasmussen concluded that it instead represented a distinct branch that had become incredibly derived in its own right and derived from the ancestor of the great auk prior to the Pliocene. This may have effectively split the Atlantic in two between an eastern Pinguinus species (ancestral to P. impennis) and the western P. alfrednewtoni, with the former expanding westward following the latter's extinction.

== Paleobiology ==
Like the great auk, P. alfrednewtoni was a flightless wing-propelled diver, meaning that they used their wings to propel themselves forward underwater in a fashion similar to penguins. While this locomotion is used by both flying and flightless auks, Smith suggests that the body weight limit for volant alcids lies at 2–2.5 kg (4.4–5.5 lb), which is exceeded by P. alfrednewtoni by nearly twice. The anatomy of the forelimbs in the Pliocene form, in particular the lesser flattening of the bones, indicates that it may have been slightly less specialised for this lifestyle than the later great auk. Another indicator of this being the case is the angle of the distal tendinal grove, which would allow P. alfrednewtoni a greater ability to flex its wing tips. Compared to this, the great auk had less mobile wing tips better suited to function as a paddle. It is regardless considered to be a highly derived alcid by Olson and Rasmussen, simply not in the same manner as its more recent relative.

Pinguinus alfrednewtoni is exclusively known from the Pliocene Yorktown Formation, a marine formation well known for its rich diversity in birds including a wide variety of auks. This includes several species of Miocepphus (M. mcclungi, M. bohaski and M. mergulellus), the extant razorbill and multiple extinct species of Alca (A. ausonia, A. grandis, A. carolinensis, A. minor, A. olsoni and A. stewarti) as well as the tufted puffin, Atlantic puffin and a form related to the rhinoceros auklet. One possible reason for the coexistence of several different types of alcids may be niche differentiation based around body size. Even among modern taxa, size plays an important factor that correlates both with foraging and nesting behavior.

Compared to the other alcids of the Yorktown Formation, P. alfrednewtoni was much scarcer, with only around 20 specimens among thousands of alcids. Olson offers two potential explanations for this apparent rarity. On the one hand, the Yorktown Formation may be outside the species' typical range, with Olson speculating that it may have been more common at higher latitudes. Notably, two of the fossil bones are far less ossified than those of breeding great auks and have subsequently been interpreted as those of juveniles. Due to the similarity to first-winter razorbill bones, it has been proposed that Pinguinus alfrednewtoni may have overwintered at Lee Creek. Another possible explanation concerns not latitude but distance from the shore. Olson interprets the deposits as representing an open ocean environment a fair distance away from the coastline. This could suggest that the flightless P. albertnewtoni preferred coastal waters and did not regularly venture as far out to sea as other alcids native to the region.
