= Divisulcus =

Divisulcus Temporal range: Middle Miocene

Scientific classification
- Kingdom: Animalia
- Phylum: Chordata
- Class: Aves
- Order: Charadriiformes
- Suborder: Lari
- Clade: Pan-Alcidae
- Genus: †Divisulcus
- Species: †D. demerei

Binomial name
- †Divisulcus demerei Smith, 2013

Extinct genus of birds

Divisulcus is an extinct genus of pan-alcid charadriiform that lived during the Middle Miocene.

== Distribution ==
Divisulcus demerei is known from the Rosarito Beach Formation located in Baja California.
