= Hydrotherikornis =

Scientific classification
- Domain: Eukaryota
- Kingdom: Animalia
- Phylum: Chordata
- Class: Aves
- Order: Charadriiformes
- Genus: †Hydrotherikornis; A. H. Miller. 1931
- Species: †H. oregonus

Binomial name
- †Hydrotherikornis oregonus A. H. Miller. 1931

Extinct genus of bird

Hydrotherikornis oregonus is an extinct species of auk. The fossil specimen was found near Coos Bay on the Oregon coast. It was found in 1926 and published in 1931. The distal tibiotarsus late Eocone fossil is one of the earliest examples of pan-Alcidae in North American.
