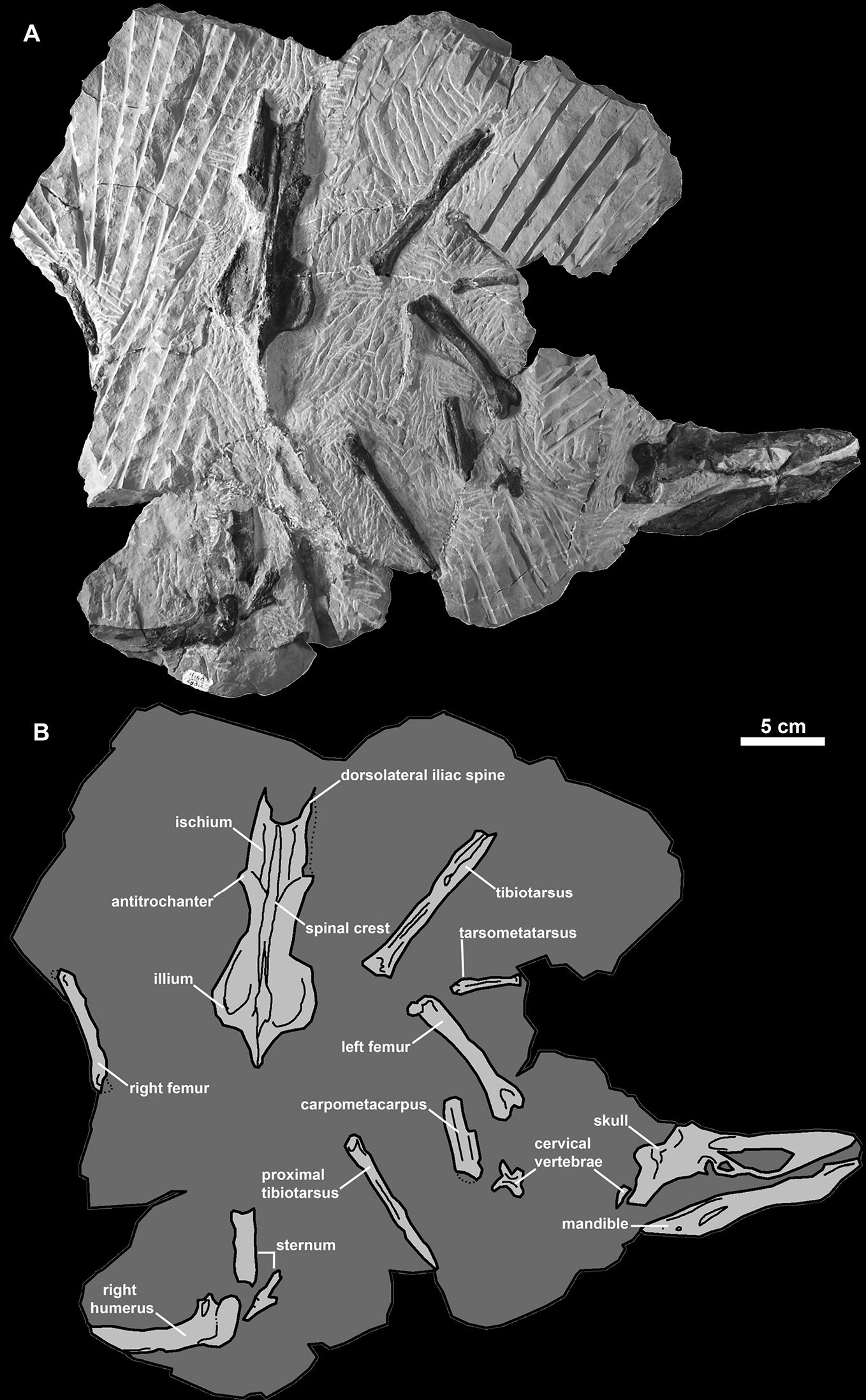
- Holotype of M. howardi

Scientific classification
- Kingdom: Animalia
- Phylum: Chordata
- Class: Aves
- Order: Charadriiformes
- Clade: †Mancallinae
- Genus: †Miomancalla

Type species
- Miomancalla wetmorei Howard, 1976

Species
- M. howardi; M. wetmorei

= Miomancalla =

Miomancalla Temporal range: Miocene

Extinct genus of birds

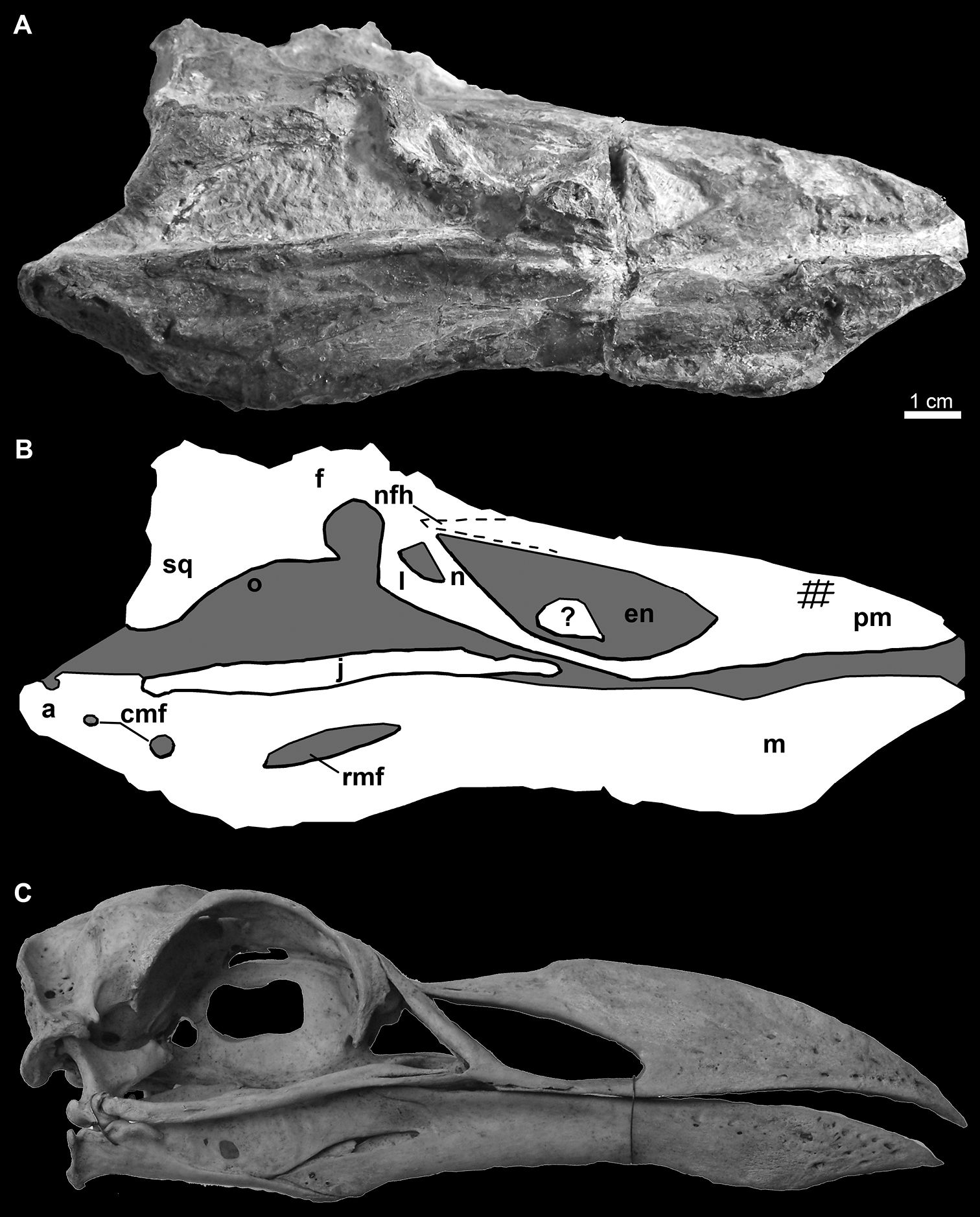
Skull of M. howardi compared with the skull of the great auk

Miomancalla is an extinct genus of prehistoric flightless alcids that lived on the Pacific coast of today's California in the Miocene epoch. It contained two species, M. howardi and M. wetmorei. M. howardi, was the largest charadriiform of all time, with an estimated body mass of 5.4 kg.
