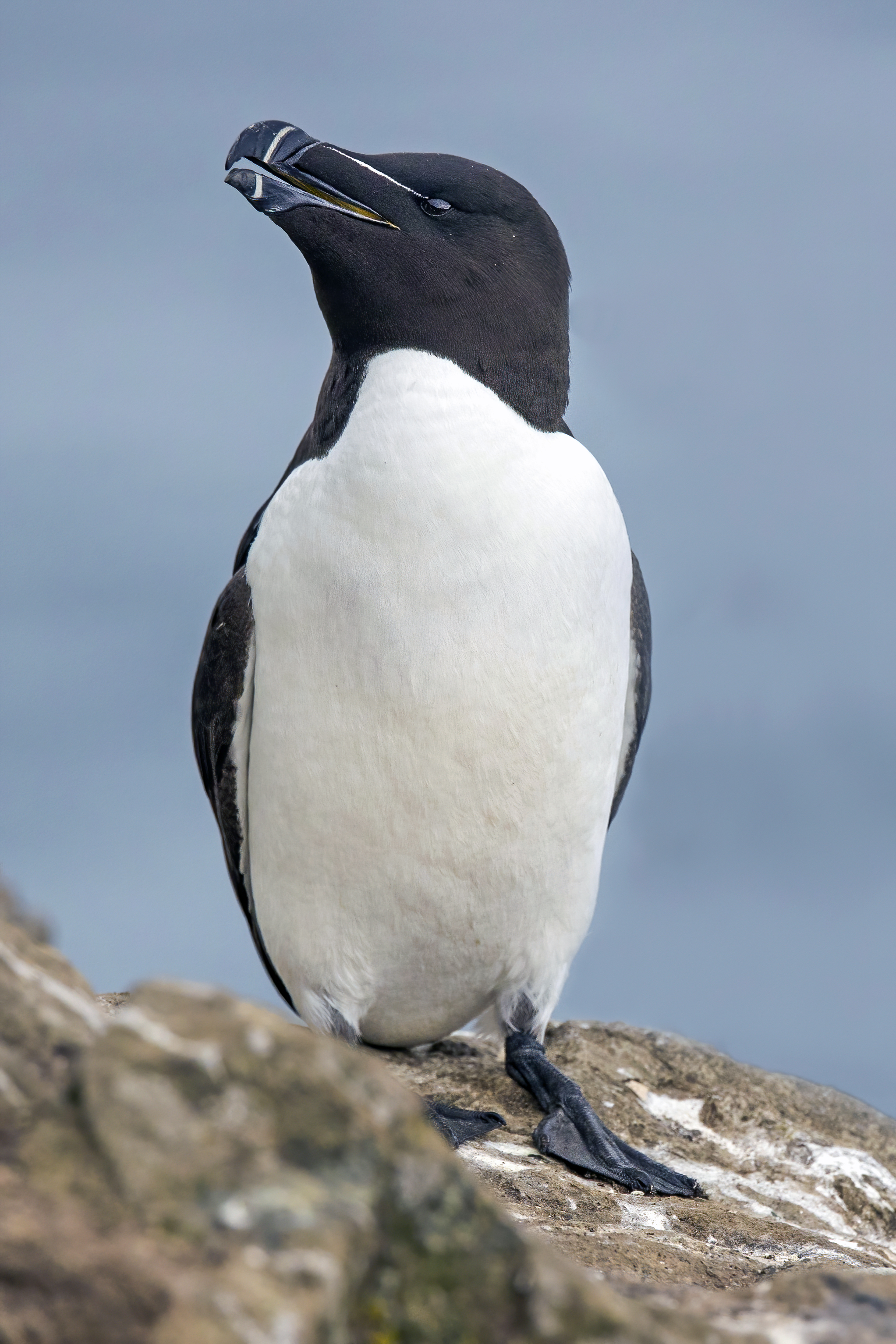
- Razorbill Alca torda

Scientific classification
- Kingdom: Animalia
- Phylum: Chordata
- Class: Aves
- Order: Charadriiformes
- Suborder: Lari
- Clade: Pan-Alcidae; Smith, 2011

Subgroups
- Alcidae; †Mancallinae; †Pseudocepphus

= Pan-Alcidae =

Pan-Alcidae Temporal range: Late Eocene - Recent 35–0 Ma

Clade of birds

Pan-Alcidae is a clade of charadriiform birds containing the auks and their extinct relatives. It was named in 2011 by N.A. Smith, who defined it as all descendants of the common ancestor of the group Mancallinae and crown group auks (Alcidae), but some have disputed the use of the Pan- prefix in general for family-group names regulated by the Zoocode (ICZN Code).

== Evolution and distribution ==
The earliest unequivocal fossils of pan-alcids are from the late Eocene, some 35 mya. The genus Miocepphus, (from the Miocene, 15 mya) is the earliest known from associated specimens. Two Paleogene fossils were previously assigned to the Alcidae, but have since been removed to other clades: Hydrotherikornis (late Eocene) is a procellariiform and Petralca (Late Oligocene) is a loon. Most extant genera are known to exist since the Late Miocene or Early Pliocene (c. 5 may). Miocene fossils have been found in both California and Maryland, but the greater diversity of fossils and tribes in the Pacific leads most scientists to conclude that it was there they first evolved, and it is in the Miocene Pacific that the first fossils of extant genera are found. Early movement between the Pacific and the Atlantic probably happened to the south (since there was no northern opening to the Atlantic), later movements across the Arctic Ocean. The flightless clade Mancallinae was present in the eastern and western Pacific Ocean and became extinct in the Late Pleistocene.
