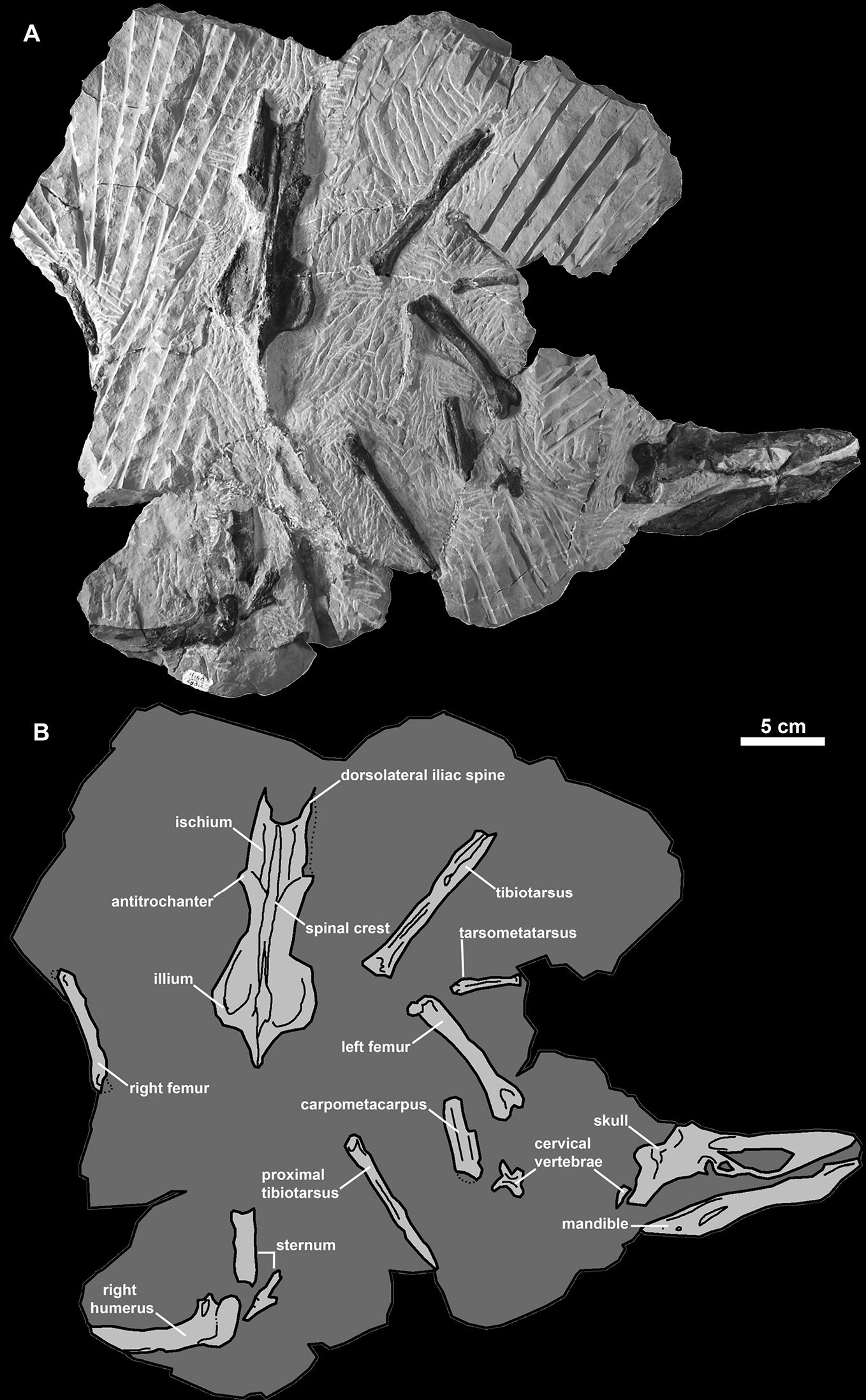
- Holotype of Miomancalla howardi

Scientific classification
- Kingdom: Animalia
- Phylum: Chordata
- Class: Aves
- Order: Charadriiformes
- Clade: Pan-Alcidae
- Clade: †Mancallinae; L. Miller, 1946

Type species
- Mancalla californiensis Lucas, 1901

Genera
- Praemancalla; Mancalla; Miomancalla; Alcodes?

= Mancallinae =

Mancallinae Temporal range: Miocene – Pleistocene, 7.4–0.47 Ma

Extinct subfamily of birds

Mancallinae is an extinct subfamily of prehistoric flightless alcids that lived on the Pacific coast of today's California and Mexico from the late Miocene epoch to the early Pleistocene (ranging from at least 7.4 million to 470,000 years ago). They are sometimes collectively referred to as Lucas auks after the scientist who described the first species, Frederic Augustus Lucas.

== Description ==
They had evolved along somewhat similar lines as the great auk, their North Atlantic ecological counterpart, but their decidedly stubbier wings were in some aspects more convergent with penguins.

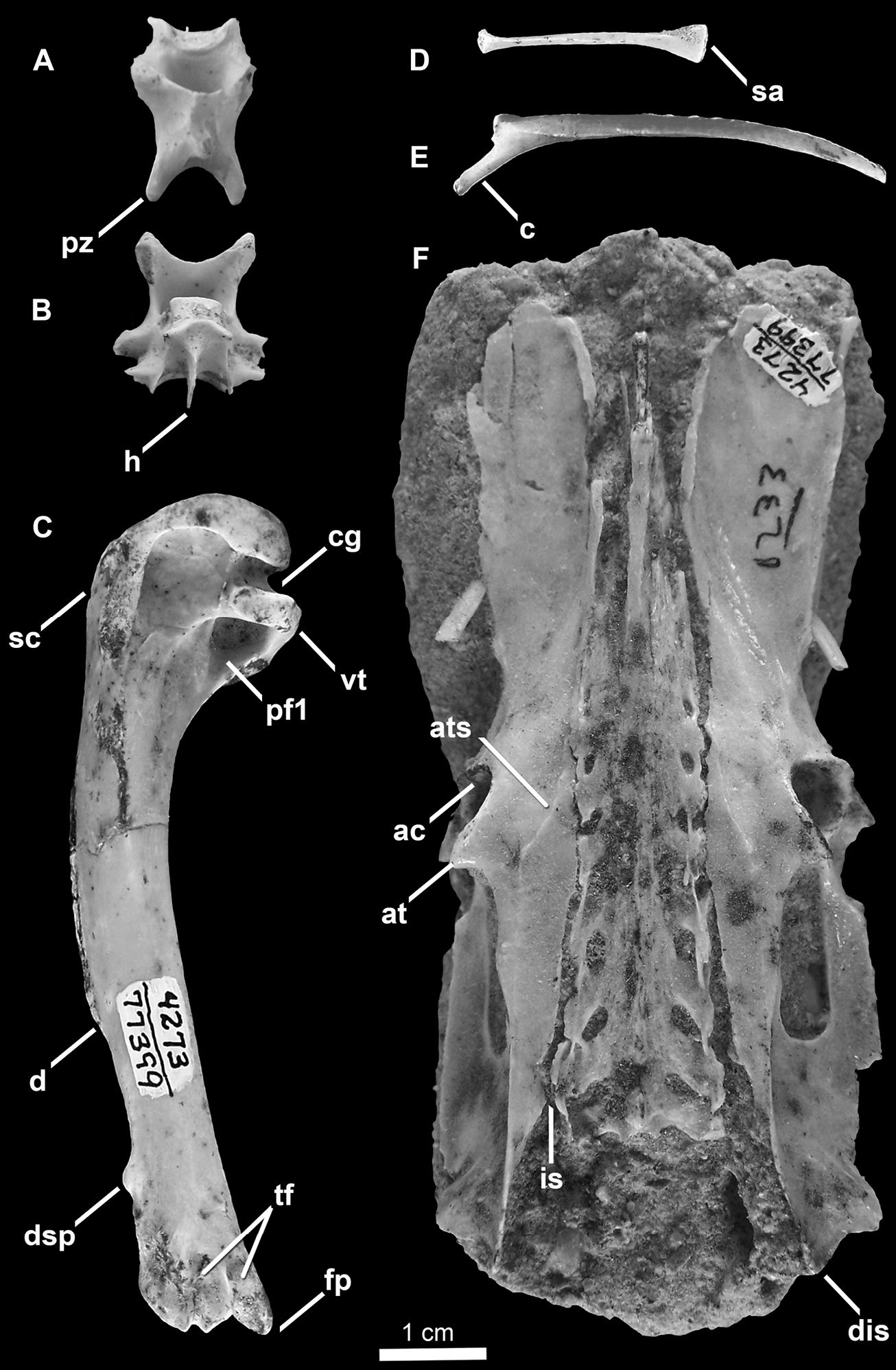
Holotype of Mancalla vegrandis

Compared with the subarctic great auk, they were also mostly smaller (see also: Bergmann's Rule): Praemancalla species have been estimated to have weighed about 3 kg. Most Mancalla forms weighed somewhat less (about 2.4 kg), with M. milleri being a smaller (1.65 kg) and M. emlongi a much larger bird (3.8 kg) than the rest. The last species thus stood around 55–60 cm high in life. The largest species, Miomancalla howardi, was the largest charadriiform of all time, with an estimated body mass of 5.4 kg.

== Evolution and classification ==
In a 2011 paper, N. Adam Smith published a review and revision of the Mancallinae. Smith defined Mancallinae as the clade containing Mancalla, Miomancalla, their common ancestor and all its descendants. A summary of his results follows.

- Pan-Alcidae Smith, 2011
  - Mancallinae L.Miller, 1946
    - Mancalla Lucas, 1901
      - Mancalla californiensis Lucas, 1901
      - Mancalla cedrosensis Howard, 1971
      - Mancalla lucasi Smith, 2011
      - Mancalla vegrandis Smith, 2011
    - Miomancalla Smith, 2011
      - Miomancalla howardi (Smith, 2011)
      - Miomancalla wetmorei (Howard, 1976)

The following species could not be identified as unquestionable mancallines, and have been assigned to Pan-Alcidae incertae sedis. They may be mancallines, or more closely related to true auks.

- Alcodes ulnulus Howard, 1968
- Mancalla diegensis Miller, 1937
- Mancalla milleri Howard, 1970

The following species could not be differentiated from other recognized species of mancallines (see above), and have been assigned to Mancallinae incertae sedis.

- Mancalla emlongi Olson, 1981
- Praemancalla lagunensis Howard, 1966

The mancallines probably evolved from proto-puffins, which must have been birds not dissimilar to the rhinoceros auklet. Accordingly, their status as a subfamily has been questioned as this would make the Alcinae (true auks) paraphyletic. However, the mancallines were a very distinct and unique evolutionary lineage and are thus usually retained as a subfamily. They must have diverged from flying ancestors during the mid-Miocene, roughly 15 mya.

Alcodes is known from a single ulna found in Late Miocene (Clarendonian, 9–12 mya) deposits at Laguna Hills, California. While assignment of such a fragmentary fossil is always problematical, the ulna is a fairly distinctive bone and that of Alcodes is quite peculiar. However, it is more allied with the Mancallines as a matter of convenience; additional material would be needed to confirm this relationship. From the bone's measurements, it seems probable that this species was flightless and judging from its age, it either represents an earlier development parallelling Mancalla, or a third lineage of flightless auks.

Praemancalla is known from Clarendonian to Early Pliocene remains. It is similar to Mancalla, but less extreme in its adaptations and it is quite possibly that the latter genus evolved from one of the two known species. Mancalla was a common species throughout the Pliocene, appearing in the Hemphillian stage of the Late Miocene (5–9 mya), and spreading in the Pliocene, with 4 species apparently coexisting at one time on the coast of southern California.

As with many marine birds, the mancalline auks were much affected by the extinction crisis in the late Pliocene oceans. This coincided with the diversification of marine mammals, but may ultimately have been caused by increased supernova activity in the vicinity of the Solar System. Despite their apparent awkwardness, they seem to have been quite well adapted for flightless birds, with the fossil record suggesting that the last remnants did not disappear until the Early Pleistocene, some time after the ecological changes had passed their peak.
