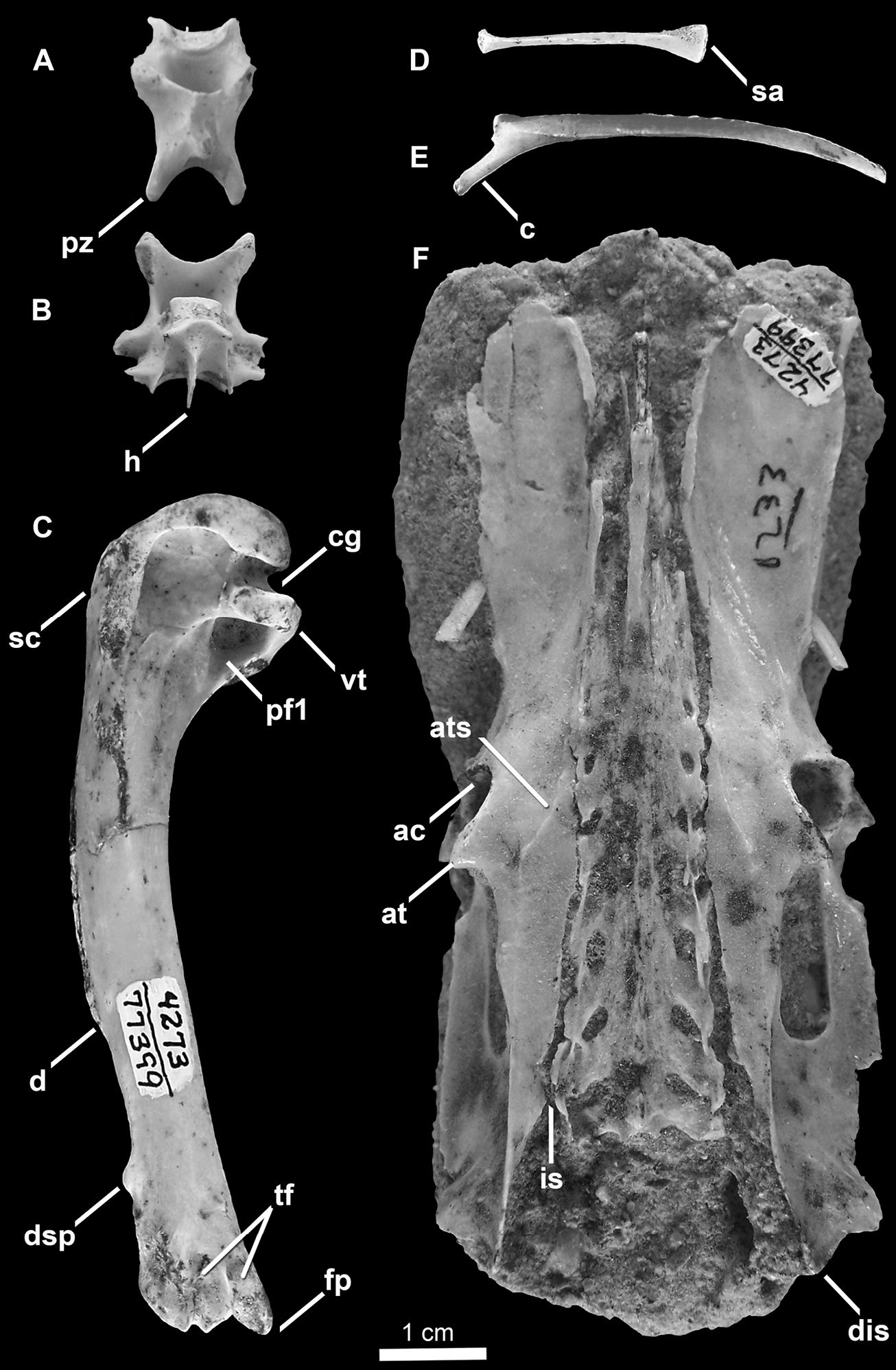
- Holotype specimen of M. vegrandis

Scientific classification
- Domain: Eukaryota
- Kingdom: Animalia
- Phylum: Chordata
- Class: Aves
- Order: Charadriiformes
- Clade: †Mancallinae
- Genus: †Mancalla

Type species
- M. californiensis Lucas, 1901

Species
- Mancalla californiensis Lucas, 1901; Mancalla cedrosensis Howard, 1971; Mancalla lucasi Smith, 2011; Mancalla vegrandis Smith, 2011

= Mancalla =

Mancalla Temporal range: Late Miocene to Early Pliocene

Extinct genus of birds

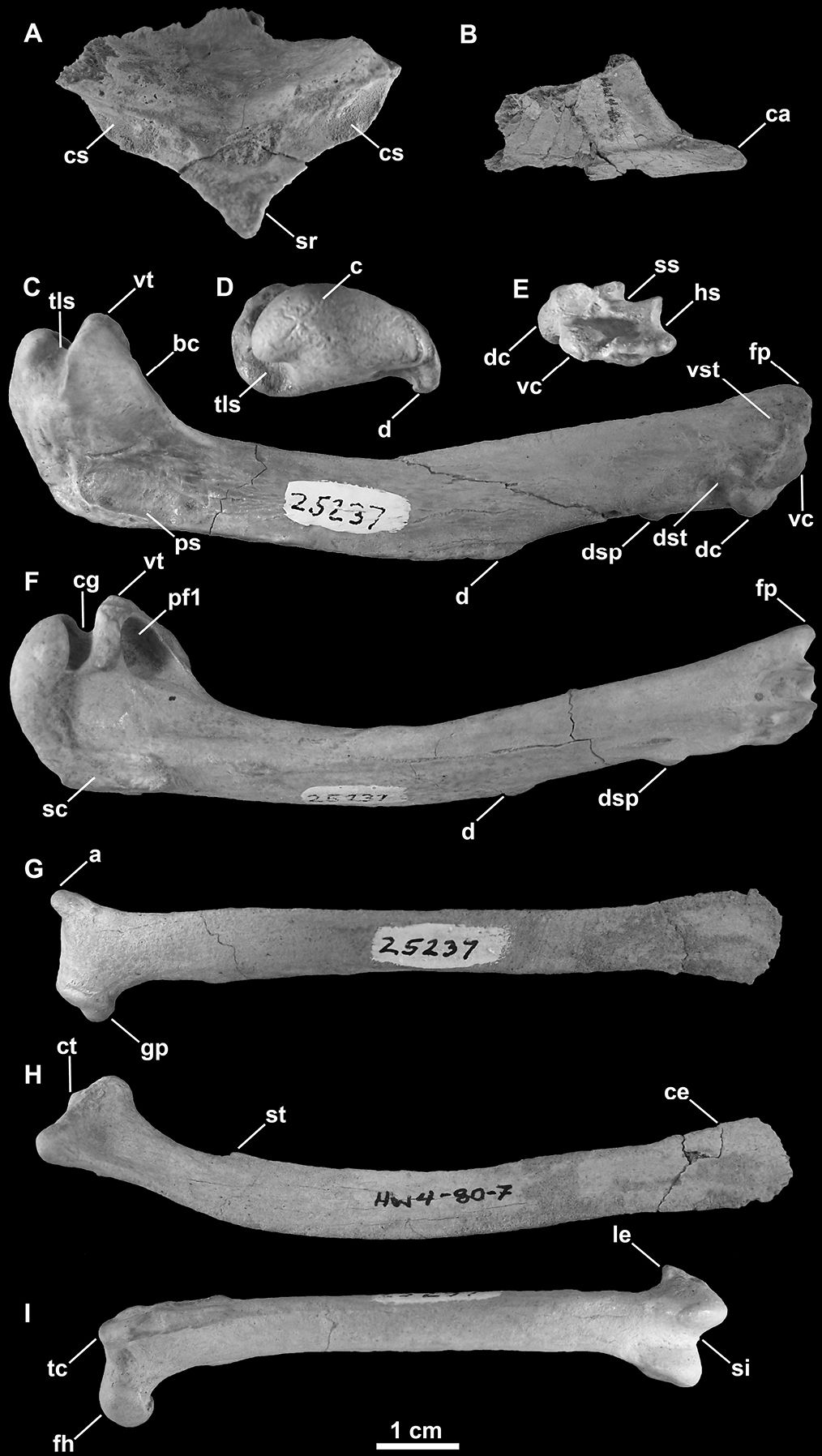
Holotype of M. lucasi

Mancalla is an extinct genus of prehistoric flightless alcids that lived on the Pacific coast of today's California and Mexico during the Late Miocene to Early Pliocene.
