= List of birds of Santa Cruz County, California =

List of birds of Santa Cruz County, California. The county is in Northern California, located on the California coast, including northern Monterey Bay, and west of the San Francisco Bay and Silicon Valley. It includes the southwestern Santa Cruz Mountains.

Avian habitats include: coastal prairie, northern coastal scrub, maritime ponderosa pine forests, coast redwood forests, interior chaparral and woodlands, and mixed evergreen forests.

Included are: common (C), fairly common (F), and uncommon (U) sightings/occurrences. Not included are: rare, casual, and irregular sightings.

| Species | Spring | Summer | Fall | Winter |
| Red-throated loon | C | - | C | F |
| Pacific loon | C | - | C | C |
| Common loon | C | - | C | F |
| Pied-billed grebe | C | F | C | C |
| Horned grebe | - | - | - | U |
| Eared grebe | - | - | - | U |
| Western grebe | C | F | C | C |
| Clark's grebe | F | F | U | F |
| American white pelican | - | U | F | U |
| Brown pelican | F | C | C | F |
| Brandt's cormorant | C | C | C | C |
| Double-crested cormorant | F | U | C | C |
| Pelagic cormorant | F | F | F | F |
| American bittern | - | - | U | U |
| Great blue heron | F | F | F | F |
| Great egret | U | - | F | F |
| Snowy egret | U | - | F | F |
| Cattle egret | - | - | - | U |
| Green heron | U | U | U | U |
| Black-crowned night heron | U | U | F | F |
| Turkey vulture | F | F | U | - |
| Canada goose | U | - | U | U |
| Brant | C | - | U | - |
| Wood duck | U | U | F | F |
| Gadwall | F | U | F | F |
| American wigeon | - | - | U | C |
| Mallard | C | C | C | C |
| Blue-winged teal | - | - | U | U |
| Cinnamon teal | C | U | U | F |
| Northern shoveler | U | - | U | F |
| Northern pintail | U | - | U | F |
| Green-winged teal | U | - | F | C |
| Canvasback | U | - | F | C |
| Ring-necked duck | U | - | U | C |
| Greater scaup | R | - | R | U |
| Lesser scaup | U | - | U | F |
| Surf scoter | C | U | C | C |
| White-winged scoter | U | - | U | U |
| Bufflehead | - | - | U | C |
| Common goldeneye | - | - | U | F |
| Hooded merganser | - | - | U | F |
| Common merganser | U | U | U | U |
| Red-breasted merganser | F | - | U | F |
| Ruddy duck | F | U | F | C |
| Osprey | U | - | U | - |
| White-tailed kite | U | U | F | F |
| Northern harrier | - | - | U | U |
| Sharp-shinned hawk | F | U | F | F |
| Cooper's hawk | F | U | F | F |
| Red-shouldered hawk | U | U | F | F |
| Red-tailed hawk | C | F | C | C |
| Ferruginous hawk | - | - | - | U |
| Golden eagle | U | U | U | U |
| American kestrel | U | U | F | F |
| Merlin | - | - | U | U |
| Peregrine falcon | U | - | U | U |
| Wild turkey | U | U | U | U |
| California quail | C | C | C | C |
| Virginia rail | U | U | F | F |
| Sora | U | - | F | F |
| Common gallinule | - | - | - | U |
| American coot | C | F | C | C |
| Black-bellied plover | C | - | C | C |
| Snowy plover | U | U | U | F |
| Semipalmated plover | F | - | F | - |
| Killdeer | U | U | F | C |
| Black oystercatcher | U | U | U | U |
| Black-necked stilt | U | - | F | F |
| American avocet | - | - | U | U |
| Greater yellowlegs | F | - | F | U |
| Lesser yellowlegs | - | - | U | - |
| Willet | C | U | C | C |
| Wandering tattler | U | - | U | - |
| Spotted sandpiper | U | - | U | U |
| Whimbrel | F | - | F | U |
| Long-billed curlew | U | - | U | - |
| Marbled godwit | C | U | C | C |
| Ruddy turnstone | F | - | F | F |
| Black turnstone | C | - | C | C |
| Surfbird | F | - | F | F |
| Sanderling | C | - | C | C |
| Western sandpiper | C | - | F | - |
| Least sandpiper | C | - | F | U |
| Dunlin | C | - | F | U |
| Short-billed dowitcher | F | - | F | - |
| Long-billed dowitcher | F | - | F | U |
| Wilson's snipe | - | - | U | F |
| Wilson's phalarope | U | - | - | - |
| Red-necked phalarope | C | - | C | - |
| Red phalarope | C | - | C | F |
| Pomarine jaeger | F | - | F | - |
| Parasitic jaeger | U | - | F | - |
| Bonaparte's gull | C | - | C | U |
| Heermann's gull | U | C | C | C |
| Mew gull | U | - | F | C |
| Ring-billed gull | U | - | F | C |
| California gull | C | U | C | C |
| Herring gull | U | - | U | F |
| Thayer's gull | - | - | U | U |
| Western gull | C | C | C | C |
| Glaucous-winged gull | F | - | C | C |
| Sabine's gull | U | - | U | - |
| Black-legged kittiwake | U | - | U | F |
| Caspian tern | F | F | - | - |
| Elegant tern | - | C | C | - |
| Common tern | F | - | F | - |
| Arctic tern | F | - | F | - |
| Forster's tern | C | F | U | F |
| Common murre | C | C | C | C |
| Pigeon guillemot | C | C | - | - |
| Marbled murrelet | F | F | U | U |
| Xantus's murrelet | - | - | U | - |
| Ancient murrelet | U | - | U | F |
| Cassin's auklet | F | F | C | C |
| Rhinoceros auklet | F | U | F | C |

| Species | Spring | Summer | Fall | Winter |
| Rock dove | C | C | C | C |
| Band-tailed pigeon | C | C | C | C |
| Mourning dove | C | C | C | C |
| Barn owl | U | U | U | U |
| Western screech-owl | C | C | C | C |
| Great horned owl | F | F | F | F |
| Northern pygmy-owl | U | U | U | U |
| Northern saw-whet owl | C | C | C | C |
| Vaux's swift | F | U | U | - |
| White-throated swift | U | U | U | U |
| Anna's hummingbird | C | C | C | C |
| Allen's hummingbird | C | F | - | - |
| Belted kingfisher | U | U | U | U |
| Acorn woodpecker | C | C | C | C |
| Red-breasted sapsucker | - | - | U | U |
| Nuttall's woodpecker | U | U | U | U |
| Downy woodpecker | F | F | F | F |
| Hairy woodpecker | F | F | F | F |
| Northern flicker | C | C | C | C |
| Pileated woodpecker | U | U | U | U |
| Olive-sided flycatcher | U | U | - | - |
| Western wood-pewee | F | F | - | - |
| Pacific-slope flycatcher | C | C | C | - |
| Black phoebe | F | F | F | F |
| Say's phoebe | - | - | U | U |
| Ash-throated flycatcher | F | F | - | - |
| Western kingbird | U | - | - | - |
| Loggerhead shrike | U | U | U | U |
| Cassin's vireo | F | F | - | - |
| Hutton's vireo | F | F | F | F |
| Warbling vireo | C | C | F | - |
| Steller's jay | C | C | C | C |
| California scrub jay | C | C | C | C |
| American crow | F | F | F | F |
| Common raven | F | F | F | F |
| Horned lark | - | - | U | - |
| Tree swallow | C | C | F | U |
| Violet-green swallow | C | C | F | U |
| Northern rough-winged swallow | U | U | - | - |
| Cliff swallow | C | C | U | - |
| Barn swallow | C | C | U | - |
| Chestnut-backed chickadee | C | C | C | C |
| Oak titmouse | U | U | U | U |
| Bushtit | C | C | C | C |
| Red-breasted nuthatch | U | U | F | F |
| Pygmy nuthatch | F | F | F | F |
| Brown creeper | F | F | F | F |
| Bewick's wren | C | C | C | C |
| House wren | F | F | U | U |
| Winter wren | F | F | F | F |
| Marsh wren | F | F | F | F |
| American dipper | U | U | U | U |
| Golden-crowned kinglet | F | F | F | F |
| Ruby-crowned kinglet | U | - | C | C |
| Blue-gray gnatcatcher | F | F | U | U |
| Western bluebird | U | U | U | U |
| Swainson's thrush | C | C | F | - |
| Hermit thrush | C | C | C | C |
| American robin | C | C | C | C |
| Varied thrush | - | - | F | F |
| Wrentit | C | C | C | C |
| Northern mockingbird | C | C | C | C |
| California thrasher | F | F | F | F |
| European starling | C | C | C | C |
| American pipit | U | - | F | C |
| Cedar waxwing | C | - | C | C |
| Orange-crowned warbler | C | C | F | U |
| Yellow warbler | F | F | F | - |
| Yellow-rumped warbler | C | F | C | C |
| Black-throated gray warbler | F | F | U | - |
| Townsend's warbler | C | - | C | C |
| Hermit warbler | F | U | U | - |
| Palm warbler | - | - | U | - |
| MacGillivray's warbler | U | - | U | - |
| Common yellowthroat | F | F | F | F |
| Wilson's warbler | C | C | C | - |
| Western tanager | F | F | F | - |
| Spotted towhee | C | C | C | C |
| California towhee | C | C | C | C |
| Chipping sparrow | U | U | - | - |
| Lark sparrow | U | U | U | U |
| Savannah sparrow | U | U | F | F |
| Grasshopper sparrow | F | F | - | - |
| Fox sparrow | U | - | F | F |
| Song sparrow | C | C | C | C |
| Lincoln's sparrow | U | - | F | C |
| Swamp sparrow | - | - | U | U |
| White-throated sparrow | - | - | U | U |
| White-crowned sparrow | C | F | C | C |
| Golden-crowned sparrow | C | - | C | C |
| Dark-eyed junco | C | C | C | C |
| Black-headed grosbeak | C | C | F | - |
| Lazuli bunting | F | F | - | - |
| Red-winged blackbird | C | C | C | C |
| Tricolored blackbird | F | F | C | C |
| Western meadowlark | F | F | C | C |
| Brewer's blackbird | C | C | C | C |
| Brown-headed cowbird | C | C | F | F |
| Hooded oriole | F | F | - | - |
| Bullock's oriole | F | F | - | - |
| Purple finch | F | F | F | F |
| House finch | C | C | C | C |
| Red crossbill | F | F | C | C |
| Pine siskin | F | F | C | C |
| Lesser goldfinch | F | F | F | F |
| Lawrence's goldfinch | F | F | - | - |
| American goldfinch | F | F | C | C |
| Evening grosbeak | - | - | F | F |
| House sparrow | C | C | C | C |

== See also ==
- List of birds of California
