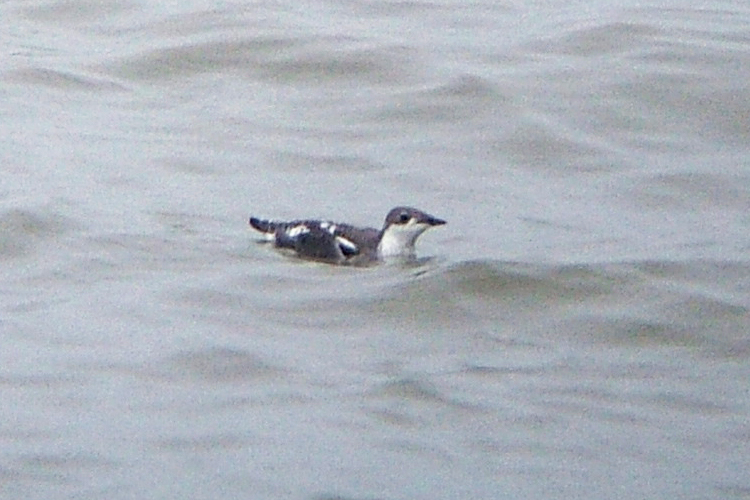

Conservation status
- Near Threatened (IUCN 3.1)

Scientific classification
- Kingdom: Animalia
- Phylum: Chordata
- Class: Aves
- Order: Charadriiformes
- Family: Alcidae
- Genus: Brachyramphus
- Species: B. perdix

Binomial name
- Brachyramphus perdix (Pallas, 1811)

= Long-billed murrelet =

Species of bird

The long-billed murrelet (Brachyramphus perdix) is a small seabird from the North Pacific. The genus name Brachyramphus is from Ancient Greek brakhus, "short", and rhamphos, "bill". The species name perdix is Latin for "partridge" Pallas described this auk as Magnitudine Perdicis. "Murrelet" is a diminutive of "murre", a word of uncertain origins, but which may imitate the call of the common guillemot.

This auk is an unusual member of the auk family, often nesting far inland in old growth forests. The long-billed murrelet, like its cousins the marbled and Kittlitz's murrelets, is thought to have experienced a decline in numbers recently.

It closely resembles the marbled murrelet, of which it was considered a subspecies until 1998, when Friesen et al. showed that the mtDNA variation was greater between these two forms than between marbled and Kittlitz's murrelets.

This species is found from Kamchatka to the Sea of Okhotsk. Most birds winter in the seas around northern Japan with some reaching South Korea and southern Japan. The Marbled Murrelet, in contrast tends to remain closer to its breeding grounds.

== Description ==
The long-billed murrelet is a small (25 cm long), chunky auk with a slender black bill. It has pointed wings and plumage that varies by season. The non-breeding appearance is typically white underneath with a black crown, nape, wings and back. The breeding plumage is mainly brown, with pale feather edges giving a scaly appearance; the central underparts, normally below the surface on a swimming bird, are white.

The long-billed murrelet is longer billed, slightly larger, and 20% heavier than the marbled murrelet, and has a white eye ring. In breeding plumage it shows a pale throat which is absent in marbled murrelet, and weaker scaling because of fewer rusty and buff markings. In winter, the long-billed murrelet lacks the white collar of the marbled.

Measurements:

- Length: 25 cm
- Weight: 310 g
- Wingspan: 43 cm

== Behaviour and breeding ==
The long-billed murrelet feeds at sea principally on small fish, both in pelagic offshore areas (often associating with upwellings), and inshore in protected bays. It tends to migrate more than its closest relative the marbled murrelet.

The breeding behaviour of the long-billed murrelet is very unusual. Unlike most other seabirds, it does not breed in colonies or even necessarily close to the sea, instead nesting in on branches of old-growth conifers. It lays one egg on a thick lichen- or moss-covered branch or hollow. The egg is incubated for a month, then the chick is fed for around 40 days until it fledges and flies unaccompanied to the sea.

== Conservation ==
The long-billed murrelet is considered globally threatened, having declined across its range over the last few decades. The biggest threat to the murrelet is the loss of the old growth forest to logging. Other losses can occur through entanglement in fishing gear. The bird could be threatened by the oil development of the Okhotsk and Bering Sea shelves.

== Vagrancy ==
The species is unusually prone to vagrancy, with records in both North America and Europe, often at inland sites well away from its usual ocean habitat.

There are about 40 records from North America (Mlodinow 1997), half of them on the Pacific coast where they might be expected, but the rest scattered across the continent east to Florida, Pennsylvania, New Jersey, New York, Massachusetts, North Carolina, South Carolina and Newfoundland, as well as on lakes and rivers several hundred kilometers from the sea, in Colorado (two), Indiana (three), Montana, Ohio, Kentucky, Tennessee, Arkansas, Wyoming (two), and Kansas (two).

The first found in Europe was a first-winter individual discovered drowned in a fishing net at Zollikon, Lake Zurich, Switzerland on a date between 15 and 18 December 1997. The specimen has been deposited at the Naturhistorisches Museum Basel (Maumary and Knaus 2000).

Europe's second was found at Dawlish Warren, Devon, England on 7 November 2006; initially identified as a little auk. It was re-found offshore from Dawlish town centre on 11 November, and attracted large crowds of birdwatchers. The bird was present until 14 November, with an estimated 1000+ birders travelled from as far afield as Edinburgh and (reportedly) the Netherlands to see it.

The third Western Palearctic record followed quickly with a bird on a reservoir in Romania, on the Olt River near Alsoporumbak from 21–23 December 2006.
