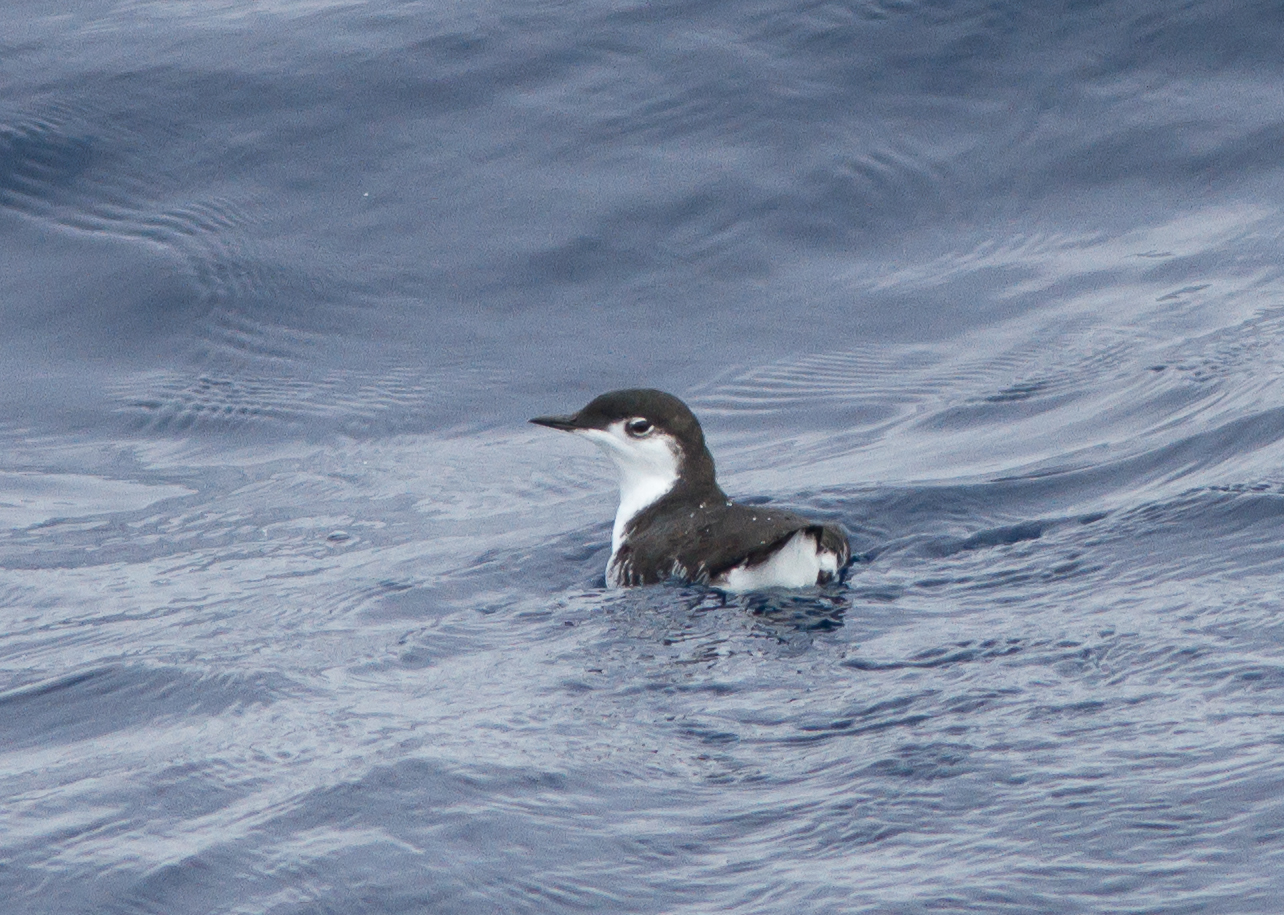

Conservation status
- Endangered (IUCN 3.1)

Scientific classification
- Kingdom: Animalia
- Phylum: Chordata
- Class: Aves
- Order: Charadriiformes
- Family: Alcidae
- Genus: Synthliboramphus
- Species: S. hypoleucus

Binomial name
- Synthliboramphus hypoleucus (Xántus, J, 1860)
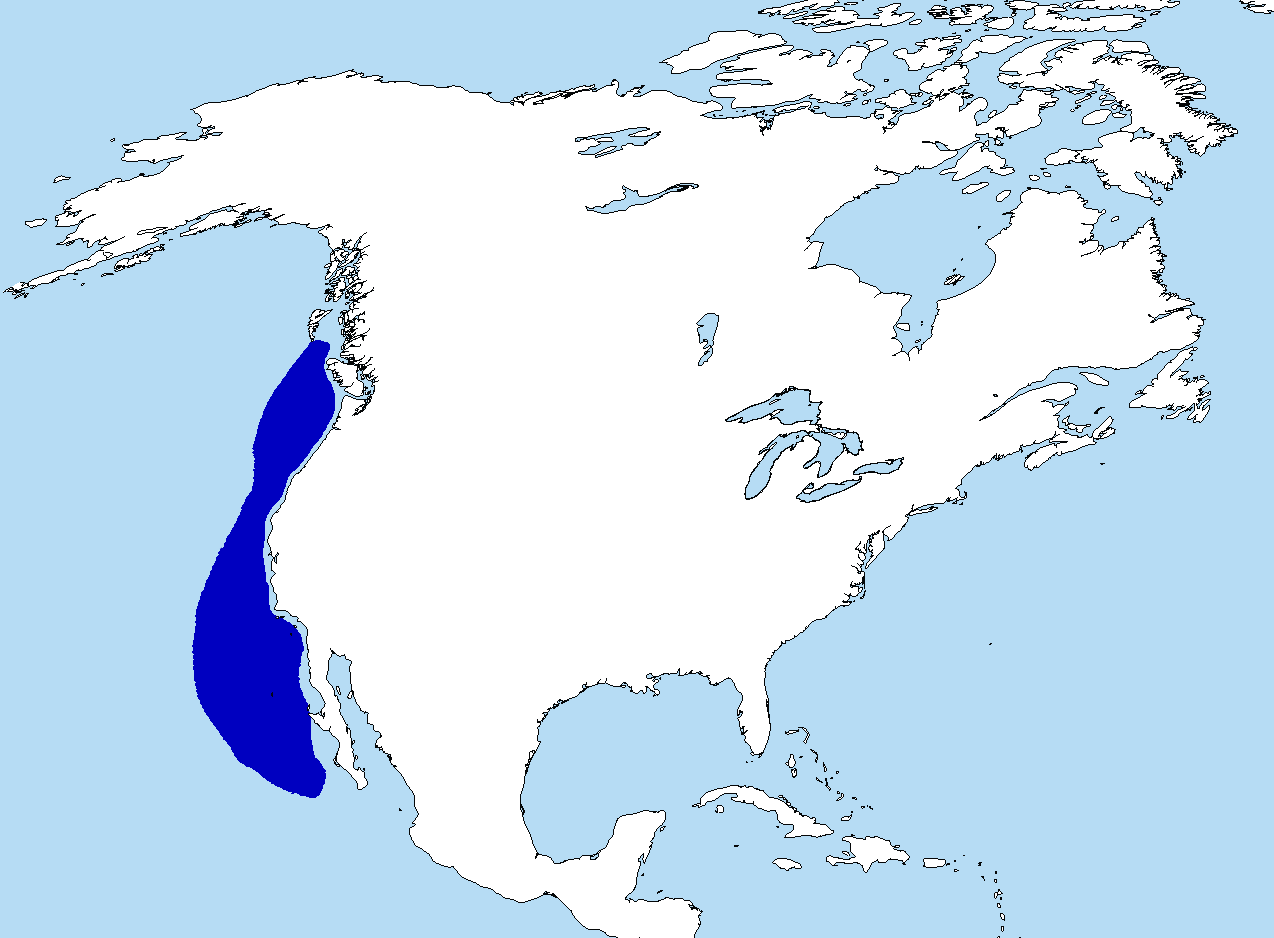

= Guadalupe murrelet =

Species of bird

The Guadalupe murrelet (Synthliboramphus hypoleucus) or Xantus's murrelet is a small seabird found in the California Current system in the Pacific Ocean. This auk breeds on islands off California and Mexico. It is threatened by predators introduced to its breeding colonies and by oil spills.

This species together with the Scripps's murrelet were considered conspecific and were classified under S. hypoleucus; known collectively as Xantus's murrelet until 2012. Enough evidence was collected to consider both species distinct based on a lack of evidence of interbreeding where the two species nest together on the San Benito Islands, differences in facial pattern and bill shape, vocalizations and genetics.

== Description and range ==
This species is a small black and white auk with a small head and thin sharp bill. It resembles the closely related Scripps's and Craveri's murrelet, with which it shares the distinction of being the most southerly living of all the auk species. It breeds from Guadalupe Island south to the San Benito Islands. After the breeding season it disperses locally at sea northward up to southern California in the United States.

== Behavior ==
Guadalupe murrelet feeds far out at sea, often in association with large pelagic predatory fish like tuna, on larval fish like anchovies, sardines and Sebastes rockfish. Like all auks it is a wing-propelled diver, chasing down prey under the water with powerful wingbeats. There is some speculation that it may feed cooperatively in pairs, as it is almost always observed in pairs, even during the non-breeding season. It flies well, and can take off without taxiing.

It nests in small crevices, caves and under dense bushes on arid islands in loose scattered colonies. It returns to the colony only at night, laying two eggs which are incubated for about a month. Like other synthliboramphine murrelets (e.g. the ancient murrelet) the chicks are highly precocial, leaving the nest within two days of hatching and running actively towards the sea, where the parents call to them. Once at sea the family swims to offshore waters.

Little is known about the time at sea due to difficulties in studying them.

== Status and conservation ==
By the end of the 20th century, the Xantus's murrelet complex was considered to be among the most endangered group of auk. This has changed since, but not because the present species' status has improved, but because other auks have become rarer.

Guadalupe murrelet is mainly threatened by oil spills, as much of its population lives near the busy shipping lanes connecting Los Angeles to other ports. Because a large part of its small population nests in such a small area a single catastrophic oil spill could have far reaching implications. It is also threatened by introduced species such as rats and feral cats; this threat has been lessened lately by efforts to restore its habitat by removing introduced predators.
