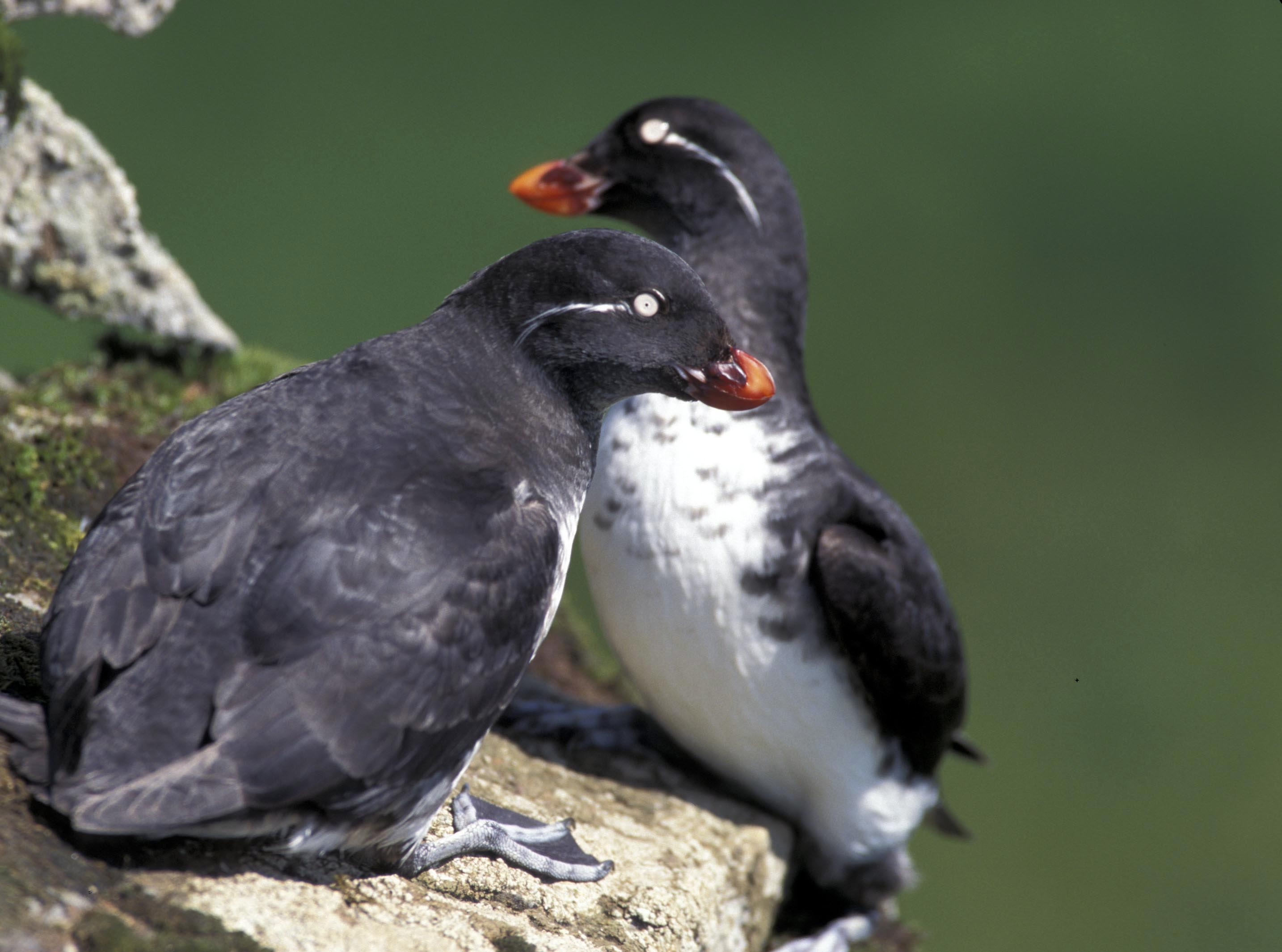
- Parakeet auklets (Aethia psittacula)

Scientific classification
- Kingdom: Animalia
- Phylum: Chordata
- Class: Aves
- Order: Charadriiformes
- Suborder: Lari
- Family: Alcidae; Leach, 1820

Type species
- Alca torda Linnaeus, 1758

Subfamilies
- Alcinae Leach, 1820; Fraterculinae Strauch, 1985

= Auk =

Auks Temporal range: Late Eocene – recent 35–0 Ma

Family of birds

Auks or alcids are birds of the family Alcidae in the order Charadriiformes. The alcid family includes the murres, guillemots, auklets, puffins, and murrelets. The family contains 25 extant or recently extinct species that are classified into 11 genera. Auks are found throughout the Northern Hemisphere.

Apart from the extinct great auk, all auks can fly, and are excellent swimmers and divers (appearing to "fly" in water), but their walking appears clumsy.

== Names ==
The English names of several species differ between Europe and North America. The two species known as 'murres' in North America are called 'guillemots' in Europe, and the species called 'little auk' in Europe is known as 'dovekie' in North America.

The word 'auk' /ɔːk/ is derived from Icelandic álka and Norwegian alka or alke, from Old Norse ālka, from Proto-Germanic *alkǭ (sea-bird, auk).

The family name Alcidae comes from the genus name Alca, which was given by Carl Linnaeus in 1758 for the razorbill (Alca torda), from the Norwegian word alke.

== Description ==
Auks are superficially similar to penguins, having black-and-white colours, upright posture, and some of their habits. However, they are not closely related to penguins, but are believed to be an example of moderate convergent evolution. Auks are monomorphic (males and females are similar in appearance).

Extant auks range in size from the least auklet, at 85 g (3 oz) and 15 cm (5.9 in), to the thick-billed murre, at 1 kg (2.2 lb) and 45 cm (18 in). Due to their short wings, auks flap their wings very quickly to fly.

Auks have largely sacrificed flight, and mobility on land, for swimming ability, although not to the extent that penguins have. Auk wings are a compromise between the best possible design for diving and the bare minimum needed for flying. This varies by subfamily, with the Uria guillemots (including the razorbill) and murrelets being the most efficient under the water, whereas the puffins and auklets are better adapted for flying and walking.

== Feeding and ecology ==
The feeding behaviour of auks is often compared to that of penguins; both groups are wing-propelled, pursuit divers. In the region where auks live, their only seabird competition are cormorants (which are dive-powered by their strong feet). In areas where the two groups feed on the same prey, the auks tend to feed further offshore. Strong-swimming murres hunt faster, schooling fish, whereas auklets take slower-moving krill. Time depth recorders on auks have shown that they can dive as deep as 100 m (330 ft) in the case of Uria guillemots, 40 m (130 ft) for the Cepphus guillemots and 30 m (98 ft) for the auklets.

== Breeding and colonies ==
Auks are pelagic birds, spending the majority of their adult lives on the open sea and going ashore only for breeding, although some species, such as the common guillemot, spend a great part of the year defending their nesting spot from others.

Auks are monogamous, and tend to form lifelong pairs. They typically lay a single egg, and they use the nesting site year after year.

Some species, such as the Uria guillemots (murres), nest in large colonies on cliff edges; others, such as the Cepphus guillemots, breed in small groups on rocky coasts; and the puffins, auklets, and some murrelets nest in burrows. All species except the Brachyramphus murrelets are colonial.

== Evolution and distribution ==
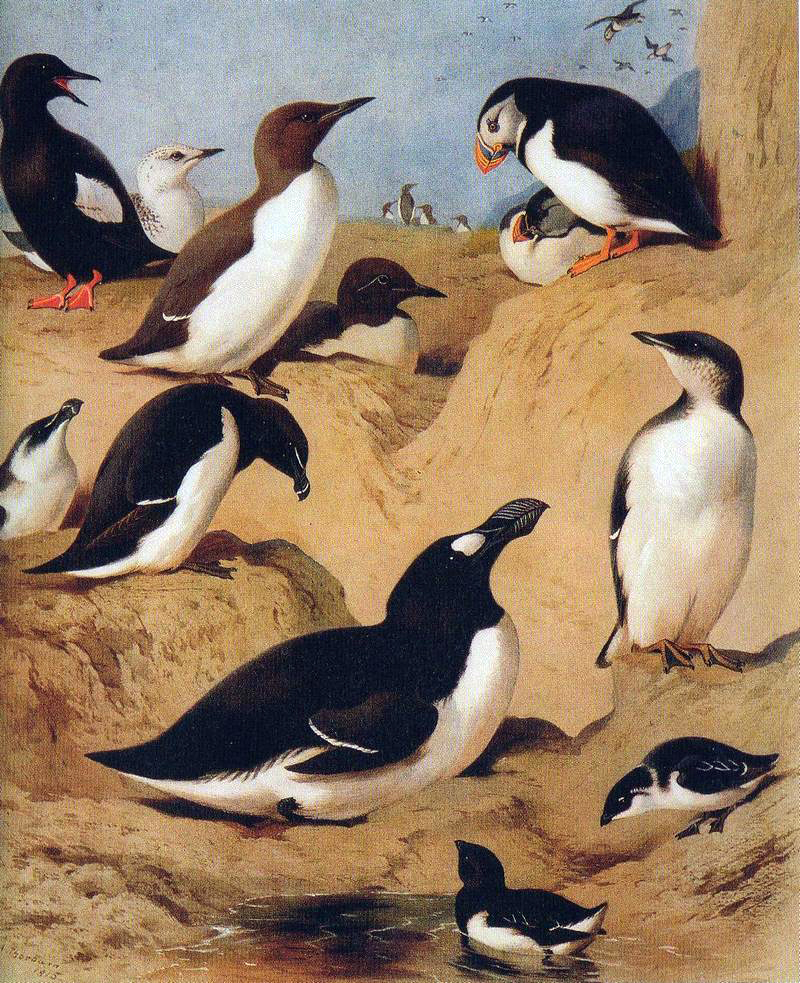
Auks as painted by Archibald Thorburn

Historically, the auks were believed to be one of the earliest distinct charadriiform lineages due to their characteristic morphology, but genetic analyses have demonstrated that these peculiarities are the product of strong natural selection, instead; as opposed to, for example, plovers (a much older charadriiform lineage), auks radically changed from a wading shorebird to a diving seabird lifestyle. Thus today, the auks are no longer separated in their own suborder (Alcae), but are considered part of the Lari suborder, which otherwise contains gulls and similar birds. Judging from genetic data, their closest living relatives appear to be the skuas, with these two lineages separating about 30 million years ago (Mya). Alternatively, auks may have split off far earlier from the rest of the Lari and undergone strong morphological, but slow genetic evolution, which would require a very high evolutionary pressure, coupled with a long lifespan and slow reproduction.

The earliest unequivocal fossils of auks are from the late Eocene, some 35 Mya. The genus Miocepphus (from the Miocene, 15 Mya) is the earliest known from good specimens. Two very fragmentary fossils are often assigned to the Alcidae, although this may not be correct: Hydrotherikornis (Late Eocene) and Petralca (Late Oligocene). Most extant genera are known to exist since the Late Miocene or Early Pliocene (about 5 Mya). Miocene fossils have been found in both California and Maryland, but the greater diversity of fossils and tribes in the Pacific leads most scientists to conclude they first evolved there, and in the Miocene Pacific, the first fossils of extant genera are found. Early movement between the Pacific and the Atlantic probably happened to the south (since no northern opening to the Atlantic existed), with later movements across the Arctic Ocean. The flightless subfamily Mancallinae, which was apparently restricted to the Pacific Coast of southern North America and became extinct in the Early Pleistocene, is sometimes included in the family Alcidae under some definitions. One species, Miomancalla howardae, is the largest charadriiform of all time.

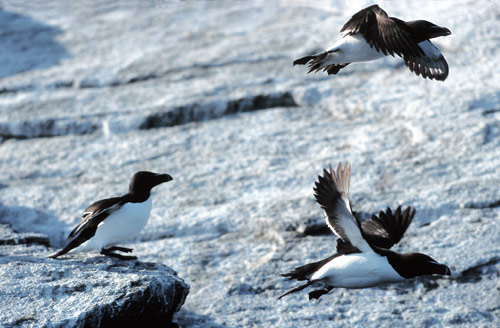
Razorbills are auks found in the Atlantic Ocean.

The family contains 25 extant or recently extinct species that are classified into 11 genera. The extant auks (subfamily Alcinae) are broken up into two main groups - the usually high-billed puffins (tribe Fraterculini) and auklets (tribe Aethiini), as opposed to the more slender-billed murres and true auks (tribe Alcini), and the murrelets and guillemots (tribes Brachyramphini and Cepphini). The tribal arrangement was originally based on analyses of morphology and ecology. mtDNA cytochrome b sequences, and allozyme studies confirm these findings except that the Synthliboramphus murrelets should be split into a distinct tribe, as they appear more closely related to the Alcini; in any case, assumption of a closer relationship between the former and the true guillemots was only weakly supported by earlier studies.

Of the genera, only a few species are placed in each. This is probably a product of the rather small geographic range of the family (the most limited of any seabird family), and the periods of glacial advance and retreat that have kept the populations on the move in a narrow band of subarctic ocean.

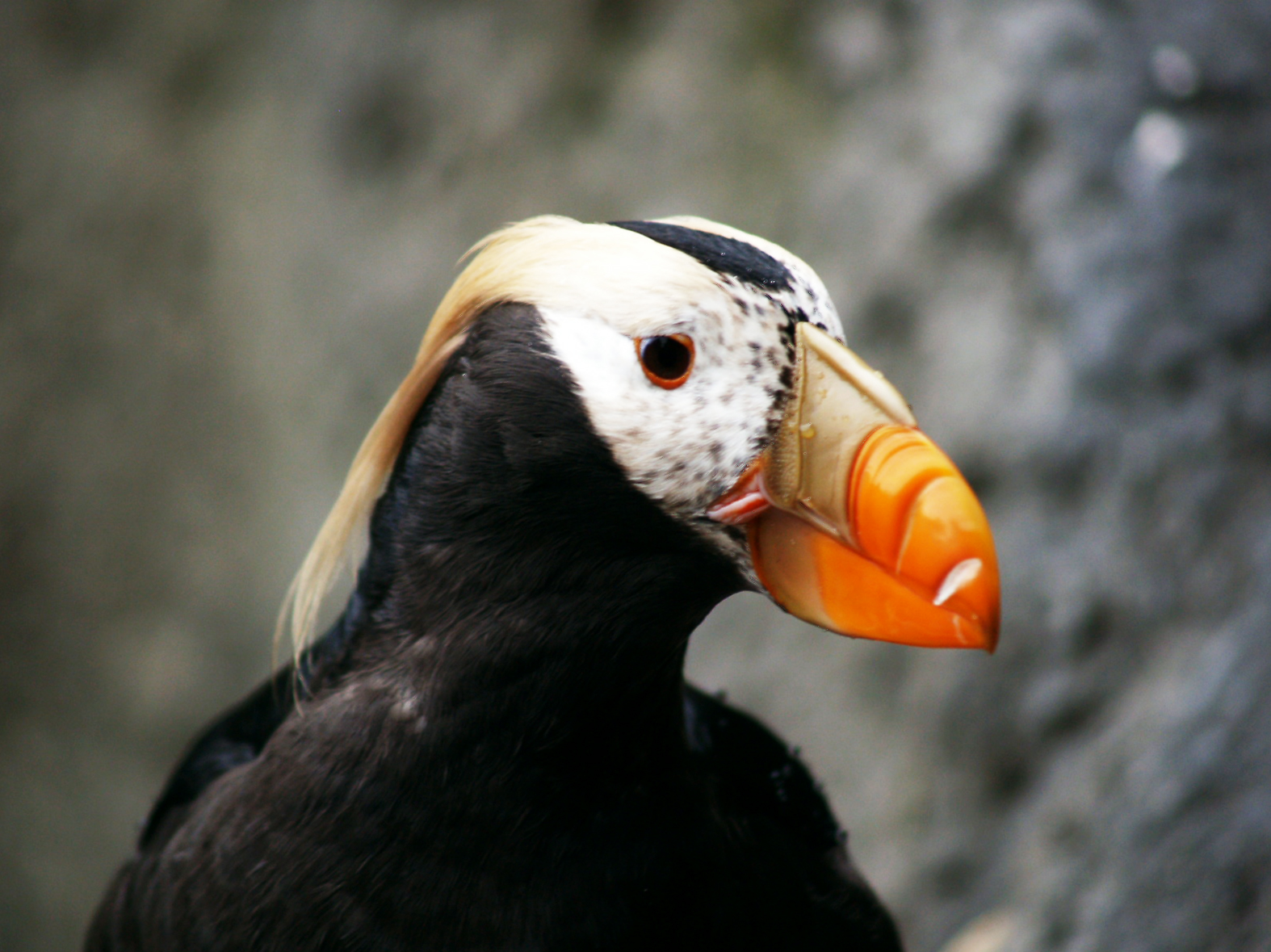
Tufted puffin (Fratercula cirrhata)

Today, as in the past, the auks are restricted to cooler northern waters. Their ability to spread further south is restricted as their prey hunting method, pursuit diving, becomes less efficient in warmer waters. The speed at which small fish (which along with krill are the auk's principal prey) can swim doubles as the temperature increases from 5 to 15 °C (41 to 59 °F), with no corresponding increase in speed for the bird. The southernmost auks, in California and Mexico, can survive there because of cold upwellings. The current paucity of auks in the Atlantic (six species), compared to the Pacific (19–20 species) is considered to be because of extinctions to the Atlantic auks; the fossil record shows many more species were in the Atlantic during the Pliocene. Auks also tend to be restricted to continental-shelf waters and breed on few oceanic islands.

== Systematics ==
- Alcidae
  - - - Rhinoceros auklet
      - - Tufted puffin
        - - Horned puffin
          - Atlantic puffin
    - - Cassin's auklet
      - - Least auklet
        - - Parakeet auklet
          - - Whiskered auklet
            - Crested auklet
  - - - - Ancient murrelet
        - Japanese murrelet
      - - Craveri's murrelet
        - - Guadalupe murrelet
          - Scripps's murrelet
    - - - Long-billed murrelet
        - - Marbled murrelet
          - Kittlitz's murrelet
      - - - Black guillemot
          - - Spectacled guillemot
            - Pigeon guillemot
        - - - Thick-billed murre
            - Common murre
          - Little auk
          - - - †Great auk
              - †Pinguinus alfrednewtoni
            - - Razorbill

Cladogram of the Alcidae family

- Basal and incertae sedis
  - Miocepphus (fossil: Middle Miocene of CE USA)
    - Miocepphus mcclungi Wetmore, 1940
    - Miocepphus bohaskai Wijnker and Olson, 2009
    - Miocepphus blowi Wijnker and Olson, 2009
    - Miocepphus mergulellus Wijnker and Olson, 2009
- Subfamily Alcinae
  - Tribe Alcini – typical auks and murres
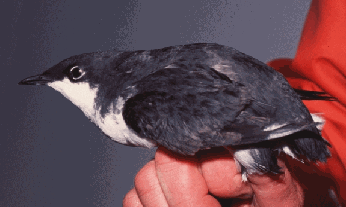
    The synthliboramphine Xantus's murrelet (Synthliboramphus hypoleucus) is quite distinct from the brachyramphine murrelets.
    - Uria
      - Common murre or common guillemot, Uria aalge
      - Thick-billed murre or, Brünnich's guillemot, Uria lomvia
    - Alle
      - Little auk or dovekie, Alle alle
    - Pinguinus
      - Great auk, Pinguinus impennis (extinct, c.1852)
      - Pinguinus alfrednewtoni Olson, 1977 (fossil: Pliocene)
    - Alca
      - Razorbill, Alca torda
  - Tribe Synthliboramphini – synthliboramphine murrelets
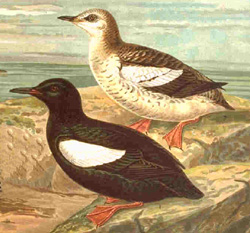
    Black guillemot (Cepphus grylle), a true guillemot, in summer (front) and winter plumage
    - Synthliboramphus
      - Scripps's murrelet, Synthliboramphus scrippsi – formerly in S. hypoleucus ("Xantus's murrelet")
      - Guadalupe murrelet, Synthliboramphus hypoleucus – sometimes separated in Endomychura
      - Craveri's murrelet, Synthliboramphus craveri – sometimes separated in Endomychura
      - Ancient murrelet, Synthliboramphus antiquus
      - Japanese murrelet, Synthliboramphus wumizusume
  - Tribe Cepphini – true guillemots
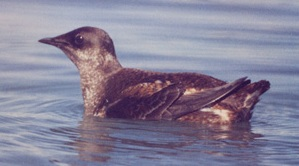
    Marbled murrelet (Brachyramphus marmoratus), a brachyramphine murrelet, in breeding plumage
    - Cepphus
      - Black guillemot or tystie, Cepphus grylle
      - Pigeon guillemot, Cepphus columba
        - Kurile guillemot, Cepphus columba snowi
      - Spectacled guillemot, Cepphus carbo
  - Tribe Brachyramphini – brachyramphine murrelets
    - Brachyramphus
      - Marbled murrelet, Brachyramphus marmoratus
      - Long-billed murrelet, Brachyramphus perdix
      - Kittlitz's murrelet, Brachyramphus brevirostris
- Subfamily Fraterculinae
  - Tribe Aethiini – auklets
    - Ptychoramphus
      - Cassin's auklet, Ptychoramphus aleuticus
    - Aethia
      - Parakeet auklet, Aethia psittacula
      - Crested auklet, Aethia cristatella
      - Whiskered auklet, Aethia pygmaea
      - Least auklet, Aethia pusilla
  - Tribe Fraterculini – puffins
    - Cerorhinca
      - Rhinoceros auklet, Cerorhinca monocerata
    - Fratercula
      - Atlantic puffin, Fratercula arctica
      - Horned puffin, Fratercula corniculata
      - Tufted puffin, Fratercula cirrhata

Biodiversity of auks seems to have been markedly higher during the Pliocene. See the genus accounts for prehistoric species.

== See also ==
- Kiviak, a traditional Inuit food from Greenland that is made of auks preserved in seal skin
- Tradeoffs for locomotion in air and water
