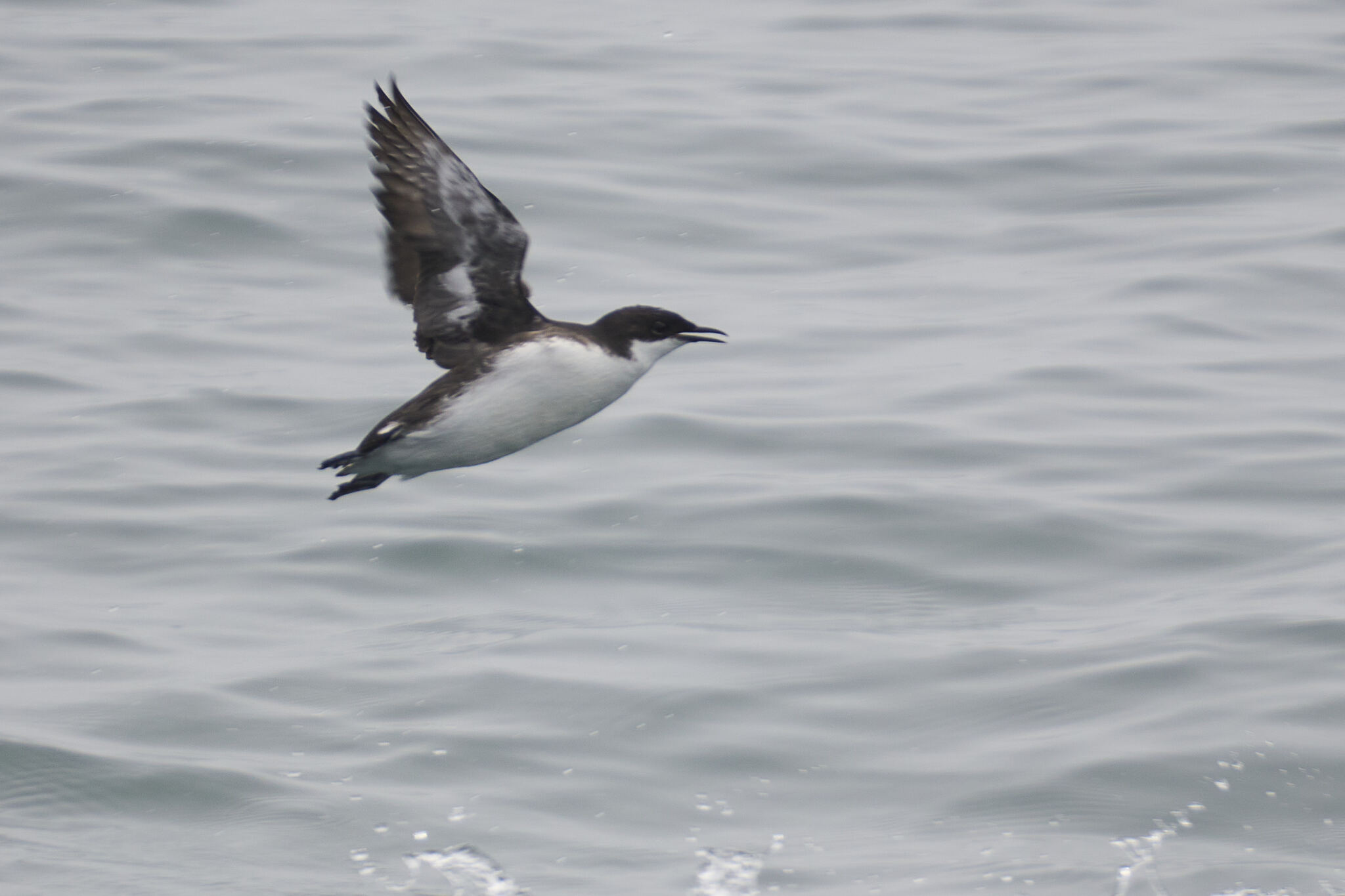

Conservation status
- Vulnerable (IUCN 3.1)

Scientific classification
- Kingdom: Animalia
- Phylum: Chordata
- Class: Aves
- Order: Charadriiformes
- Family: Alcidae
- Genus: Synthliboramphus
- Species: S. craveri

Binomial name
- Synthliboramphus craveri (Salvadori, 1866)

= Craveri's murrelet =

Species of bird

Craveri's murrelet (Synthliboramphus craveri) is a small seabird which breeds on offshore islands in both the Pacific Ocean and the Gulf of California off the Baja peninsula of Mexico. It also wanders fairly regularly as far as central California in the US, primarily during post-breeding dispersal. It is almost never seen from or near the shore. With an estimated population of 6,000-10,000 breeding pairs, its population is listed as vulnerable.

== Description and Identification ==
The Craveri's murrelet is a small black and white auk with a small head and thin sharp bill. It resembles the closely related Scripps's murrelet, with which it shares the distinction of being the most southerly living of all the auk species.

The Craveri's murrelet has a partial neck collar (Scripps's has none), and dusky underwings (Scripps's has white underwings). Craveri's black face mask dips a bit further down the face compared to the Scripps's. Both species can be also separated by voice. Craveri's murrelet also has a tendency to hold its tail upward when sitting on the water, a trait Scripps's does not show.

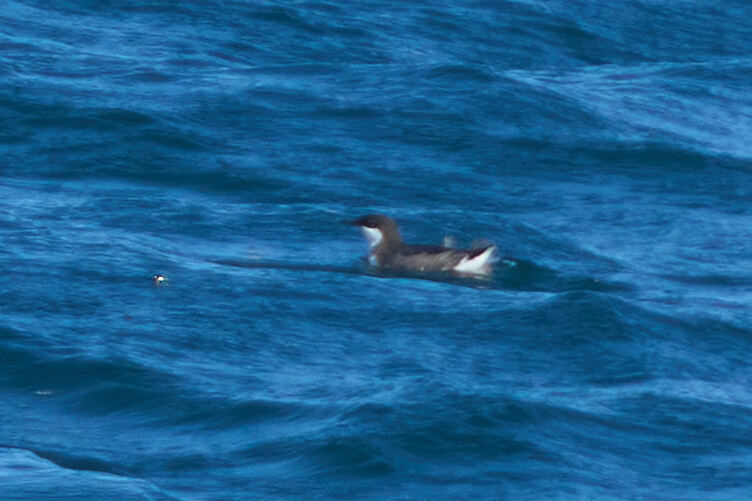
Craveri's Murrelet north of San Nicholas Island, showing distinct upright tail posture when not in flight

== Behaviour ==
Craveri's murrelet feeds far out at sea on larval fish such as herring, rockfish, and lanternfish. Like all auks it is a wing-propelled diver, chasing down prey under the water with powerful wingbeats. It flies well, and can take off without taxiing.

The Craveri's murrelet nests in small crevices, caves and under dense bushes on arid islands in loose scattered colonies. It returns to the colony only at night, laying two eggs which are incubated for about a month. Like other murrelets of the genus Synthliboramphus (like the ancient murrelet) the chicks are highly precocial, leaving the nest within two days of hatching and running actively towards the sea, where the parents call to them. Once at sea the family swims to offshore waters. Little is known about the time at sea due to difficulties in studying them.

== Threats ==
Craveri's murrelet is considered by some to be one of the more endangered species of auk. It is threatened by offshore oil drilling and tanker traffic. Increased tourist developments and birds getting caught in nets from commercial fishing operations also pose a danger. It is also threatened by introduced species at its breeding colonies such as mice, rats and feral cats; this threat has been lessened lately by efforts to restore its habitat by removing introduced predators.

== Name ==
This species was described, named and dedicated to Federico Craveri and Ettore Craveri by the ornithologist Tommaso Salvadori, in acknowledgment of the fact that the Craveri brothers had enriched the Turin Museum of Natural History with many species of birds of Mexico and California.
