= Federico Craveri =

Italian explorer (1815–1890)

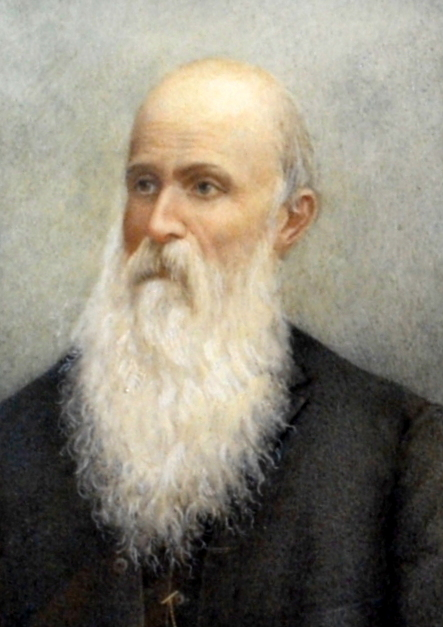
- Federico Craveri
- Born: 1815; Turin
- Died: 1890 (aged 74–75); Bra
- Scientific career
- Fields: explorer, geologist and naturalist.

Federico Craveri (Turin, 1815 – Bra, 1890) was an Italian explorer, ethnographer, geologist, meteorologist and naturalist noted for his studies in Mexico.

== Biography ==
Federico Craveri studied chemistry and meteorology at the University of Turin. In 1840 he moved to Mexico, which had recently gained independence from Spain. From 1840 until 1859 he taught chemistry at the National Museum in Mexico City. In Mexico, he obtained a graduation in Chemistry and Pharmacy.

In 1847 he was joined in Mexico for two years by his brother Ettore, who shared similar interest in nature. Federico Craveri explored this country for a few years (1855–1857) to study its geology, with particular regard to the Trans-Mexican Volcanic Belt.

In Mexico as well in the United States Federico Craveri collected specimens of many animals and plants. These collections were placed, on his return to Italy, in the family home of Bra. For thirty years he took care of the classification of the material brought back from his travels, that included an extensive collection of birds notably hummingbirds.

Until his death he taught at the University of Turin. The private collections of the Craveri family were donated to the town of Bra and now they are kept at the Museo Civico di Storia Naturale Federico ed Ettore Craveri, which bears the name of both brothers. Part of the collections are also kept in the Museum of Natural History in Turin.

== Travels ==
Federico Craveri accomplished three voyages of discovery in Northern and Central America. Following a mandate conferred by the Mexican government, in 1855 he first explored the islands of the Gulf of California in search of guano then used as organic fertilizer. He explored the mining region of Sinaloa succeeding in finding some new mines.

The following year he explored the coasts of the Pacific and the Islands of Baja California, until then little known and virtually uninhabited, but rich in birds and marine mammals. He discovered a new island to which he gave the name of Elide, in memory of his first tormented love. He returned to this island in 1857, taking possession in the name of the Mexican Government. Then he made a second expedition to the mining region of Sinaloa.

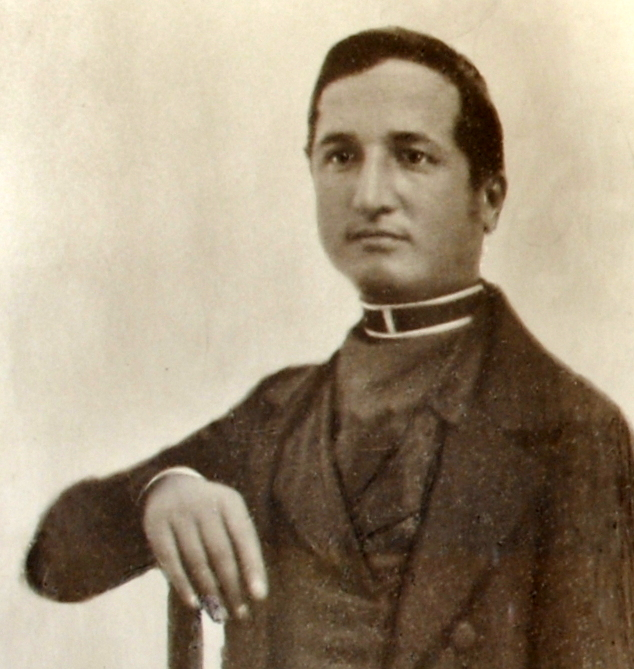
Ettore Craveri

In 1858 Federico Craveri left for San Francisco, went to Vancouver Island and sailed up the Fraser River. Finally he made an exploratory trip to the gold-mining region of California. In 1859 he reached Panama and then Cuba. He went up the Mississippi to Saint Paul. He sailed on the Great Lakes and reached the Niagara Falls. He then visited New York, Washington and Boston and finally on September 11, 1959 he returned to his father's birthplace in Italy, Bra, after 19 years of absence.

During his travels, Craveri also discovered a new species of murrelet (Synthliboramphus craveri), which in 1865 was described, named and dedicated to Federico Craveri and Ettore Craveri by the ornithologist Tommaso Salvadori, in acknowledgment of the fact that the Craveri brothers had enriched the Turin Museum of Natural History with many species of birds of Mexico and California. This bird is now known in North American literature as Craveri's Murrelet.

The name of the Italian naturalist Craveri is also borne by an extinct crab (Retropluma craverii), an extinct turtle (Testudo craverii) and an extinct cephalopod mollusk (Sepia craverii), from the tertiary period of Piedmont. Various species of Mexican diptera were dedicated to his brother Ettore Craveri (Tipula craverii, Tabanus craverii, Mallophora craverii and Diogmites craverii).

== Insect collections ==
General Insecta collections from Italy and Mexico collected by Frederico and Ettore are held by Museo Civico di Storia Naturale "Federico ed Ettore Craveri" (Bra); Coleoptera from Mexico are held by Museo Civico di Storia Naturale di Genova; Diptera from Mexico are in the Luigi Bellardi, collection in Museo Regionale di Scienze Naturali di Torino.

== Bibliography ==
- Fra indios e yankees. Viaggi in America di Federico Craveri. Amministrazione comunale di Bra
- Bowen, T. 2013. The type locality of Craveri's murrelet Synthliboramphus craveri. Marine Ornithology 41:49–54.
- Edward S. Gruson (1972). Words for Birds. A Lexicon of North American Birds with Biographical Notes, Quadrangle Books (New York) : xiv + 305 p.
- Federico Craveri Avventura ed esplorazione naturalistica in America Centrosettentrionale 1855-1859 - Giornale di Viaggio - Vol. I Editore: Museo Civico Craveri-Bra
- Storrs L. Olson, The name of then Craveri Brothers' Murrelet Department of Vertebrate Zoology, National Museum of Natural History, Smithsonian Institution, Washington, D.C. 20560
- Thomas Bowen, Enriqueta Velarde, Daniel W. Anderson, and Stephen A. Marlett Federico Craveri and changes in nesting seabirds on Isla Rasa, Gulf of California, since 1856
- Velarde, E., C. J. Navarro, E. A. Ruiz, and A. Aguilar. 2011. The status of Craveri's murrelet Synthliboramphus craveri and reoccupation of a former nesting area. Marine Ornithology 39:269–273.
