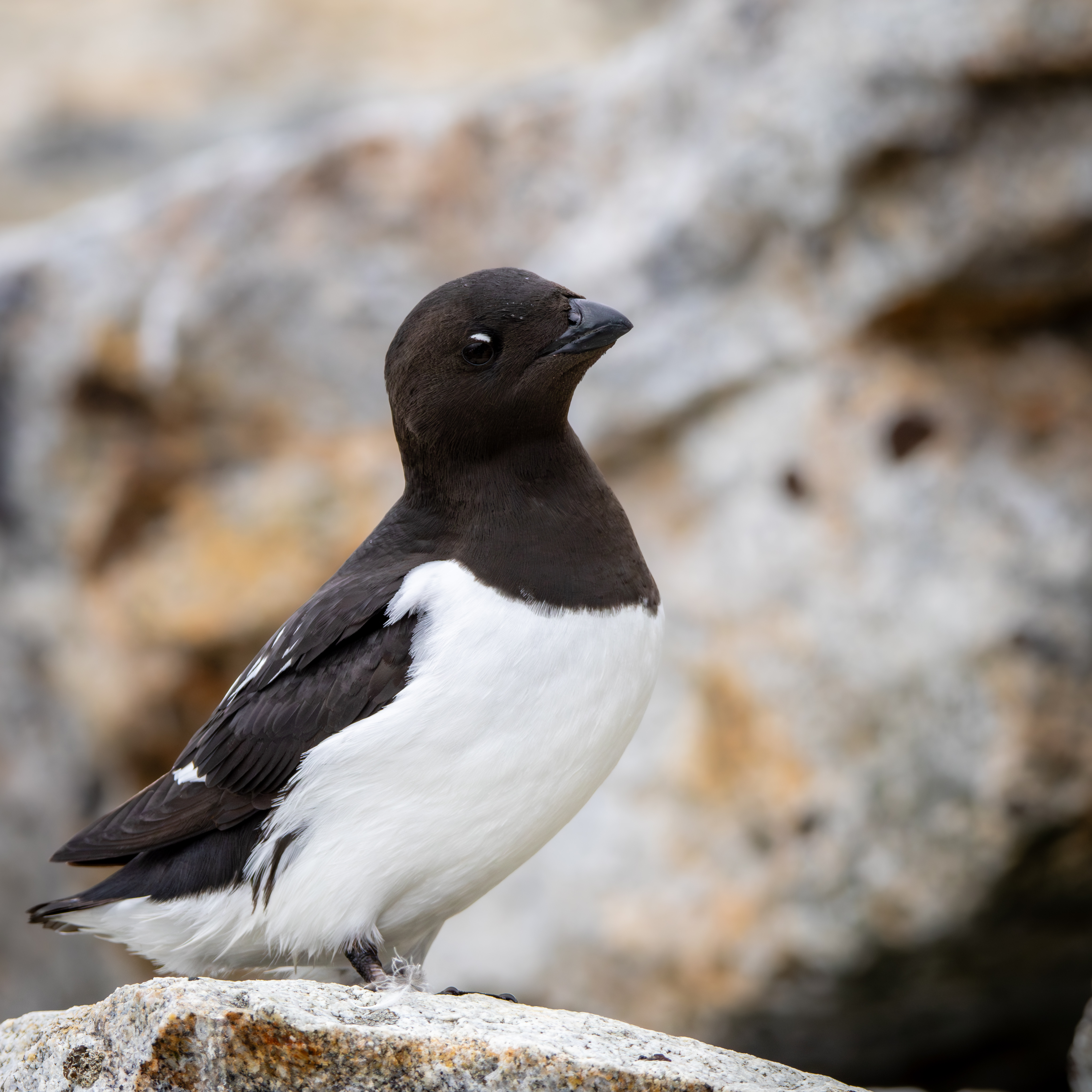
- Breeding adult, Spitzbergen

Conservation status
- Least Concern (IUCN 3.1)

Scientific classification
- Kingdom: Animalia
- Phylum: Chordata
- Class: Aves
- Order: Charadriiformes
- Family: Alcidae
- Genus: Alle; Link, 1806
- Species: A. alle

Binomial name
- Alle alle (Linnaeus, 1758)

Subspecies
- A. a. alle - (Linnaeus, 1758); A. a. polaris - Stenhouse, 1930
- Distribution map of the little auk Breeding Migration Nonbreeding

Synonyms
- Alca alle Linnaeus, 1758

= Little auk =

Species of bird

The little auk (Europe) or dovekie (North America) (Alle alle) is a small auk, the only member of the genus Alle. It breeds in huge numbers on islands in the high Arctic of the North Atlantic Ocean. There are two subspecies; A. a. alle breeds in Greenland, Novaya Zemlya and Svalbard; and A. a. polaris on Franz Josef Land. A small number of individuals also breed on Little Diomede Island in the Bering Strait, with additional breeding individuals thought to occur on King Island, St. Lawrence Island, St. Matthew Island and the Pribilof Islands in the Bering Sea. It also formerly bred on Grímsey just north of Iceland, but is extinct there now. In winter, they disperse widely across the Arctic and North Atlantic Oceans, with the largest numbers in the Arctic close to the pack ice edge, and smaller numbers south to northern Great Britain in the eastern Atlantic, and Nova Scotia in the western Atlantic.

== Taxonomy ==
The little auk was formally described in 1758 by the Swedish naturalist Carl Linnaeus in the tenth edition of his Systema Naturae. He placed it with the other auks in the genus Alca and coined the binomial name Alca alle. Linnaeus specified the type locality as Ocean of Arctic, Europe and America but this is now restricted to Scotland. The species was formerly placed in the genus Plautus, but in 1973 this name was suppressed by the commission of the International Code of Zoological Nomenclature and now the little auk is the only species placed in the genus Alle that was introduced in 1806 by the German naturalist Heinrich Friedrich Link.

Two subspecies are accepted:

- A. a. alle (Linnaeus, 1758) – Baffin Island (Arctic northeast Canada), northwest, east Greenland, north Iceland, Jan Mayen (northeast of Iceland), Svalbard (north of Norway) and Novaya Zemlya (north of northwest Russia)
- A. a. polaris Stenhouse, 1930 – Franz Josef Land (northeast of Novaya Zemlya, in Arctic Russia); perhaps Severnaya Zemlya (north of central Russia) to St. Lawrence Island (Bering Sea, Alaska)

== Etymology ==
The genus and species epithet is from allē, the Sami word for the long-tailed duck (Clangula hyemalis); it is onomatopoeic and imitates the call of the drake duck. Linnaeus was not particularly familiar with the winter plumages of either the auk or the duck, and appears to have confused the two species. Other old names include rotch, rotche, bullbird, and sea dove, although the latter sometimes refers to a relative, the black guillemot.

== Description ==
This is the only Atlantic auk of its size, half the size of the Atlantic puffin, at 19–21 cm (7.5–8.3 in) in length, with a 34–38 cm (13–15 in) wingspan. The adult weight ranges from 130–200 g (4.6–7.1 oz). A. a. polaris is marginally larger than the nominate subspecies. In breeding plumage, the head, neck, back, and wings are black, with a white trailing edge to the secondary feathers, and white fringes on the scapular feathers, and pure white underparts. The bill is short and stubby. They have a small rounded black tail. The lower face and fore neck become white in winter plumage.

Little auks produce a variety of twitters and cackling calls at the breeding colonies, but tend to be silent at sea.

== Behaviour and ecology ==
=== Food and feeding ===
The flight is fast and direct, with rapid whirring wing beats due to their short wings. These birds forage for food like other auks by swimming underwater. They mainly eat crustaceans, especially copepods, of which a 150 g (5.3 oz) bird requires ~60,000 individuals per day (equivalent to 30 g [1.1 oz] of dry food weight), but they also eat small invertebrates such as mollusks, as well as small fish. Recent evidence suggests that the little auk forages not by filter-feeding on planktonic prey, but by visually-guided suction-feeding. They feed close to the shoreline during the breeding season, and feed near ice edges and coastlines during the winter.

=== Breeding ===
Little auks breed in large colonies on scree slopes on marine cliffsides. They nest in crevices or beneath large rocks, and may build rudimentary nests by bringing small pebbles and/or old grasses and lichen into the cavity, where they lay a single egg. Their single pale greenish blue egg is placed in a crevice of the rocks. Like other auks, they are monogamous and have high nest-site fidelity, meaning that the same cavity is often used as a nest site by the same pair, year to year. The eggs are generally incubated by both parents equally, for roughly a month (28–31 days), until chicks begin to hatch at about 25 days. Hatchlings generally weigh about 21 g and are unable to thermoregulate on their own; they are brooded for approximately 5 days until they are able to thermoregulate, after which they are only attended to for feeding by parents. The young fledge from their nests at an age of 26–29 days old, synchronously with others on the colony, usually at night.

=== Winter ===
All little auks migrate south by winter into northern areas of the North Atlantic. The species is also commonly found in the Norwegian Sea. Late autumn storms may carry them south of their normal wintering areas, or into the North Sea, and can cause wrecks of these birds, along with other seabirds, at sea and occasionally on land. The British record count was made at the Farne Islands in Northumberland following strong northerly gales on 9–11 November 2007, with 18,381 flying north on 9th and 28,803 on 11th. They are sometimes blown ashore in Newfoundland.

The glaucous gull and the Arctic fox are the main predators of little auks at colonies, with other gulls and raptors predating the species as well. In some cases, the polar bear has also been reported to feed on little auk eggs.

== Interaction with humans ==
Due to their habit of feeding near shore during both summer and winter months, the species has been an important source of food for Inuit of Greenland, Baffin Island, and Labrador, as well as at parts of its southern range in eastern Canada.

Kiviaq is an Inuit food from Greenland. It is made by stuffing a seal skin with 300 to 500 little auks. Once full and airtight, the skin is sealed with seal fat and the little auks are left to ferment for 3 to 18 months under a pile of rocks. Caught in spring, little auks are a human food resource in winter. However, Knud Rasmussen's death is attributed to food poisoning by kiviaq.

On the south coast of Newfoundland, Canada, the dovekie is known colloquially as the bull(y) bird or ice bird. The birds were once hunted, stuffed with savoury dressing and oven-baked. It was a food of last resort to prevent winter starvation amongst the fisher people of Newfoundland's outport communities. Shot with BB pellets on ice pans off Newfoundland's south coast, a feed would consist of 5–6 birds per person. Similarly, a hunt continues to occur for murres in the province of Newfoundland and Labrador, and mainly acts as a subsistence hunt for traditional hunters, who shoot wintering murres near ice flows in coastal waters as a food source.

== Conservation ==
Although populations appear to be decreasing, this is not currently thought to be rapid enough to be of concern for the species in the medium term, especially as global little auk numbers are generally rather fluid. Little auks have been shown to be able to buffer fluctuations in prey availability, caused by climate change, via plasticity in their foraging behaviour, which is likely to make accurate conservation assessments more difficult.

Little auk swimming and diving.

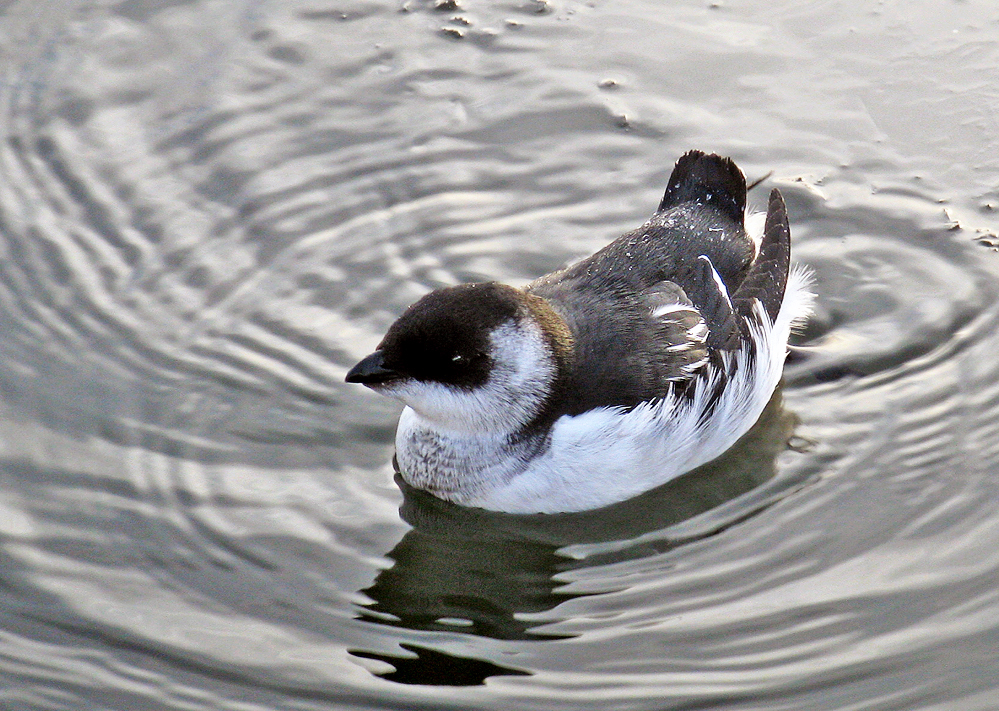
Little auk in winter plumage

== See also ==
- Great auk
