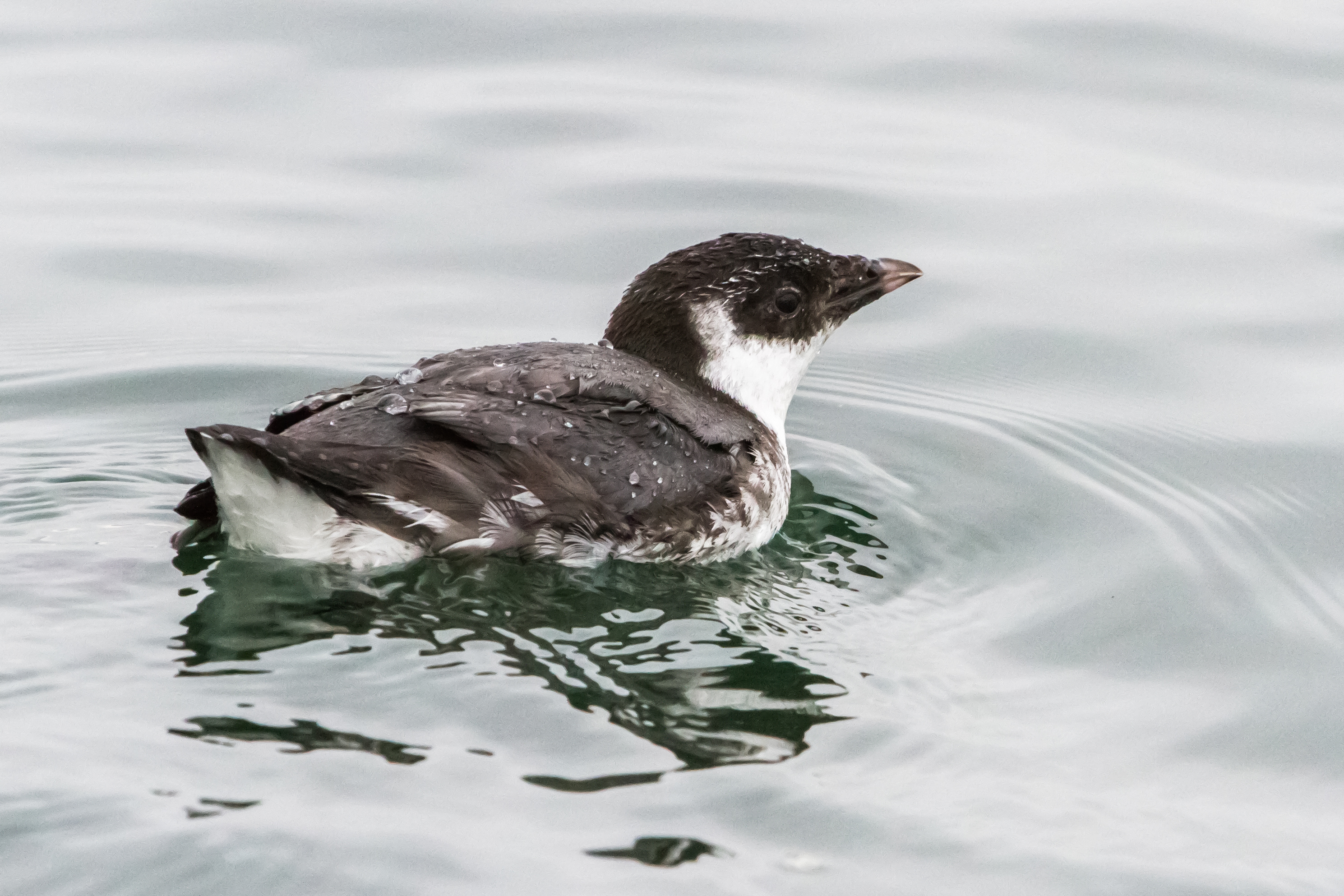
- Ancient murrelet (Synthliboramphus antiquus)

Scientific classification
- Domain: Eukaryota
- Kingdom: Animalia
- Phylum: Chordata
- Class: Aves
- Order: Charadriiformes
- Family: Alcidae
- Genus: Synthliboramphus; Brandt, JF, 1837

Type species
- Alca antiqua Gmelin, JF, 1789

Species
- S. hypoleucus S. scrippsi S. craveri S. antiquus S. wumizusume

Synonyms
- Endomychura

= Synthliboramphus =

Genus of birds

Synthliboramphus is a small genus of seabirds in the auk family from the North Pacific. The genus name Synthliboramphus is from Ancient Greek sunthlibo, "to compress", and rhamphos, "bill". The English name "Murrelet" is a diminutive of "murre", a word of uncertain origins, but which may imitate the call of the common guillemot.

== Taxonomy ==
The genus Synthliboramphus was introduced in 1837 by the German born naturalist Johann Friedrich von Brandt. The type genus was subsequently designated by George Robert Gray as the ancient murrelet. The genus name combines Ancient Greek sunthlibō meaning "to compress" with rhamphos meaning "bill".

The genus contains five species:

Image	Scientific name	Common name	Distribution
	Synthliboramphus hypoleucus	Guadalupe murrelet	the California Current system in the Pacific Ocean.
	Synthliboramphus scrippsi	Scripps's murrelet	California Current system in the Pacific Ocean
	Synthliboramphus craveri	Craveri's murrelet	the Pacific Ocean and the Gulf of California off the Baja peninsula of Mexico
	Synthliboramphus antiquus	Ancient murrelet	northeast Asia, Aleutian Islands to western Canada, Commander Islands (eastern Russia).
	Synthliboramphus wumizusume	Japanese murrelet	Japan and southern Korea.

The first two species were formally considered conspecific, and are sometimes separated in the genus Endomychura.

Fossil remains of two prehistoric species are known: an undescribed Synthliboramphus sp. from the Late Miocene or Early Pliocene (c. 5 mya) of Cedros Island, Mexico, and Synthliboramphus rineyi from the Late Pliocene (around 3.5-2 mya) San Diego Formation of the southwestern USA.

These birds breed in colonies, their eggs being laid directly amongst tree roots or in rock crevices. They are nocturnal on the breeding grounds, presumably to reduce predation, and for the same reason the precocial young are never fed at the nest, being taken to sea a couple of days after hatching. The parents call to the young from out at sea, and the chicks swim towards the adults who keep moving further out throughout the night.

Synthliboramphus species disperse out to sea after breeding, with northern species migrating further south.

Synthliboramphus auks are small, with mainly black upper parts and white the short wings. These birds forage for food like other auks, by swimming underwater. They mainly eat fish, also some crustaceans and other small invertebrates.
