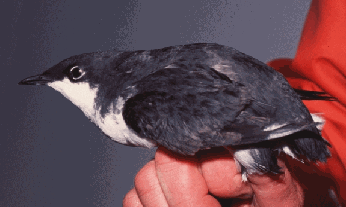

Conservation status
- Vulnerable (IUCN 3.1)

Scientific classification
- Kingdom: Animalia
- Phylum: Chordata
- Class: Aves
- Order: Charadriiformes
- Family: Alcidae
- Genus: Synthliboramphus
- Species: S. scrippsi

Binomial name
- Synthliboramphus scrippsi (Green & Arnold, 1939)
- Year-round Nonbreeding

Synonyms
- Synthliboramphus hypoleucus scrippsi

= Scripps's murrelet =

Species of bird

Scripps's murrelet (Synthliboramphus scrippsi) is a small seabird found in the California Current system in the Pacific Ocean. This auk breeds on islands off California and Mexico. It is threatened by predators introduced to its breeding colonies and by oil spills.

This species and the Guadalupe murrelet were considered conspecific and were known collectively as Xantus's murrelet until 2012. The two species are now considered distinct based on a lack of evidence of interbreeding at a shared nesting colony on the San Benito Islands, differences in facial pattern and bill shape, and differences in vocalizations and genetics.

== Description and range ==
This species is a small black and white auk with a small head and thin sharp bill. It resembles the closely related Craveri's murrelet, with which it shares the distinction of being the most southerly living of all the auk species. It breeds on islands in the Channel Islands of California, the largest colonies being on the Coronado Islands and on Santa Barbara Island, and also several islands off Baja California, including Isla Guadalupe. After the breeding season it disperses north at sea, usually to offshore waters, as far as British Columbia.

== Behavior ==
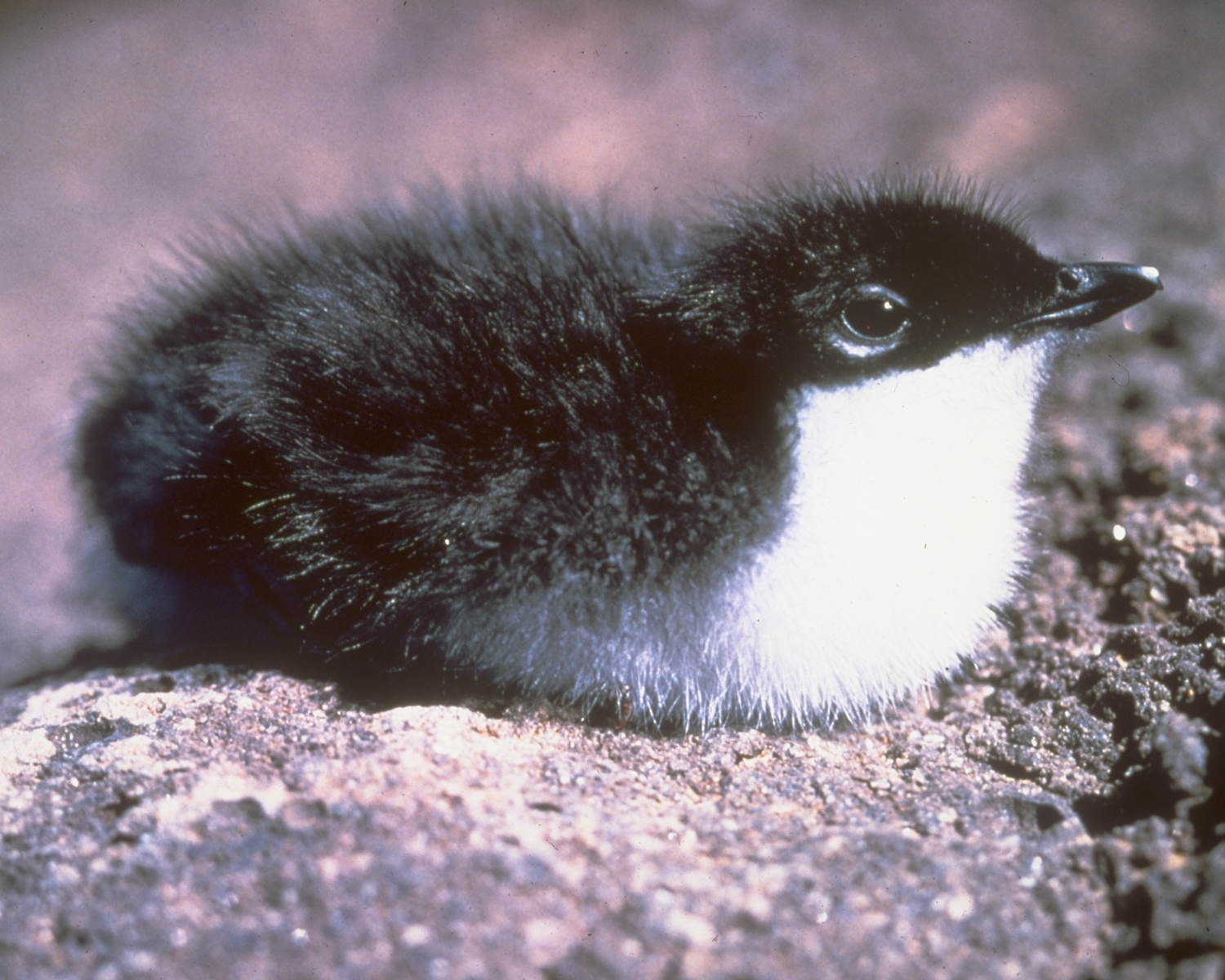
Scripps's murrelet chicks leave the nest for the ocean at just two days old.

Scripps's murrelet feeds at sea (but on average not as far from land as Guadalupe murrelet), often in association with large pelagic predatory fish like tuna, on larval fish like anchovies, sardines and Sebastes rockfish. Like all auks it is a wing-propelled diver, chasing down prey under the water with powerful wingbeats. There is some speculation that it may feed cooperatively in pairs, as it is almost always observed in pairs, even during the non-breeding season. It flies well, and can take off without taxiing.

It nests in loose scattered colonies on arid islands, typically in small crevices and caves and under dense bushes. It returns to the colony only at night, laying two eggs which are incubated for about a month. As in other synthliboramphine murrelet species (e.g. the ancient murrelet) the chicks are highly precocial, leaving the nest within two days of hatching and running actively towards the sea, where the parents call to them. Once at sea the family swims to offshore waters.

Little is known about their time at sea due to difficulties in studying them in this habitat. A female shot at Isla Guadalupe at the end of June was moulting its primary remiges (flight feathers) and unable to fly.

== Status and conservation ==
By the end of the 20th century, the Xantus's murrelet complex was considered to be among the most endangered species of auk. This has changed since, but not because the present species' status has improved, but because other auks have become rarer.

Scripps's murrelet is mainly threatened by oil spills, as much of its population lives near the busy shipping lanes connecting Los Angeles to other ports. Because a large part of its small population nests in such a small area, a single catastrophic oil spill could have far reaching implications. It is also threatened by introduced species such as rats and feral cats; this threat has been lessened lately by efforts to restore its habitat by removing introduced predators. In 2001 and 2002, Island Conservation, the Channel Islands National Park, California Department of Fish and Game, the U.S. Fish and Wildlife Service, and the National Oceanic and Atmospheric Administration removed invasive rats from Anacapa Island. This effort was paid for by a trust fund from an oil spill settlement.
