= Xantus's murrelet =

Xantus's murrelet, native to the California Current system, has been split into two species:

- Scripps's murrelet, Synthliboramphus scrippsi
- Guadalupe murrelet, Synthliboramphus hypoleucus
