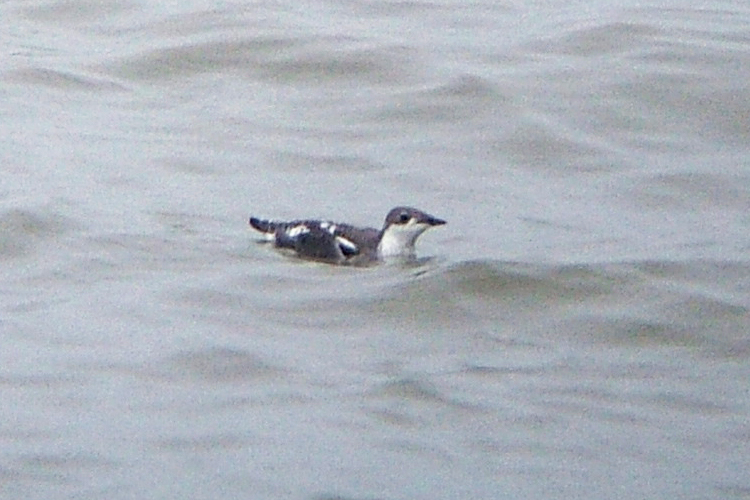
- Long-billed murrelet Brachyramphus perdix

Scientific classification
- Kingdom: Animalia
- Phylum: Chordata
- Class: Aves
- Order: Charadriiformes
- Family: Alcidae
- Genus: Brachyramphus; Brandt, JF, 1837

Type species
- Colymbus marmoratus Gmelin, JF, 1789

Species
- B. marmoratus B. perdix B. brevirostris

= Brachyramphus =

Genus of birds

Brachyramphus is a small genus of seabirds from the North Pacific. Brachyramphus is from Ancient Greek brakhus, "short", and rhamphos, "bill". In English the species are named as "murrelets"; this is a diminutive of "murre", a word of uncertain origins, but which may imitate the call of the common guillemot.

== Taxonomy ==
The genus Brachyramphus was introduced in 1837 by the German born naturalist Johann Friedrich von Brandt. The type genus was subsequently designated by George Robert Gray as the marbled murrelet. The genus name combines Ancient Greek brakhus meaning "short" with rhamphos meaning "bill".

The genus contains three species:

Image	Scientific name	Common name	Distribution
	Brachyramphus marmoratus	Marbled murrelet	Kenai Peninsula, Barren islands, and Aleutian Islands
	Brachyramphus perdix	Long-billed murrelet	Kamchatka to the Sea of Okhotsk
	Brachyramphus brevirostris	Kittlitz's murrelet	Prince William Sound, the Kenai Peninsula, sparsely up the west coast and along the Aleutian Islands

These are unusual members of the auk family, often nesting far inland in forests or on mountain tops. The long-billed murrelet was considered conspecific with the marbled murrelet until 1998, when Friesen et al. showed that the mtDNA variation was greater between these two forms than between marbled and Kittlitz's murrelets.

These species breed in the subarctic North Pacific. They tend to remain coastal in winter, either staying near the breeding grounds, or, in the case of long-billed, migrating to the coast of Japan.

Two prehistoric species have been described from Late Pliocene fossils, found in the San Diego Formation of the southwestern US: Brachyramphus dunkeli Chandler, 1990 and Brachyramphus pliocenus Howard, 1949

== Description ==
These are small chunky auks, no more than 25 cm long. Like other auks, they have plumage that varies by season. The non-breeding appearance is typically white underneath with mainly black upperparts. The breeding plumage is distinctive in this group; most auks are strongly contrasted with black and white when breeding, but Brachyramphus species are mainly brown, with pale feather edges giving a scaly appearance; the central underparts, normally below the surface on a swimming bird, are white.

== Behaviour and breeding ==
Murrelets feed at sea on small fish, larval fish, krill and other small zooplankton. Chicks are fed with larger fish carried in the bill.

The breeding behaviour of this genus is very unusual. Unlike most other seabirds, they do not breed in colonies or even necessarily close to the sea, instead nesting, depending on species, on branches of old-growth conifers, mountaintops, or on open ground. They lay one egg on bare ground or on a thick lichen- or moss-covered branch or hollow. The egg is incubated for a month, then the chick is fed for around 40 days until it fledges and flies unaccompanied to the sea. Breeding success is low and chick mortality high.

== Threats ==
All three Brachyramphus murrelets are globally threatened and declining in numbers. The biggest threat are the loss of nesting habitat, due to the loss of old growth forest to logging and retreating, entanglement in (plastic) fishing gear and oil spills.
