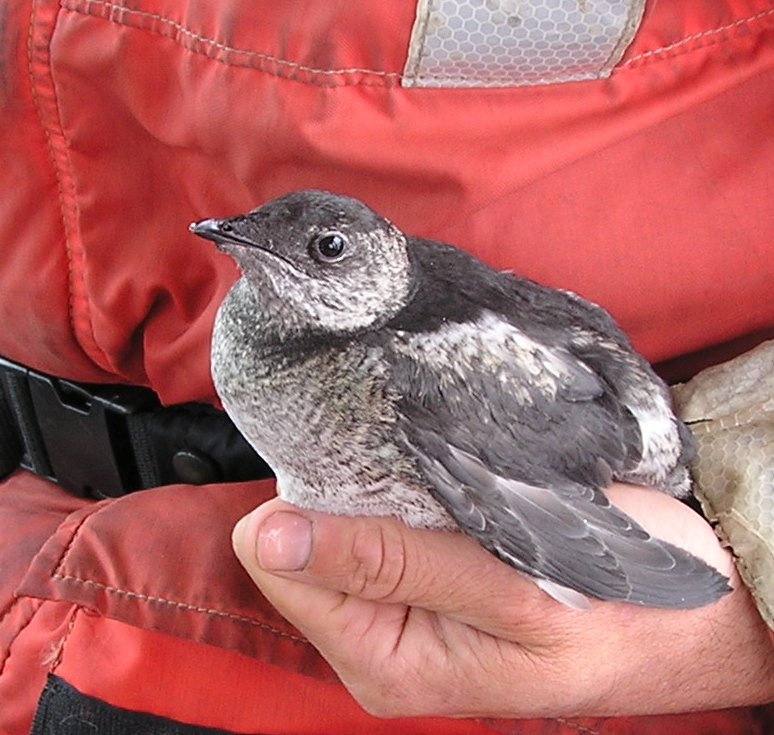

Conservation status
- Near Threatened (IUCN 3.1)

Scientific classification
- Kingdom: Animalia
- Phylum: Chordata
- Class: Aves
- Order: Charadriiformes
- Family: Alcidae
- Genus: Brachyramphus
- Species: B. brevirostris

Binomial name
- Brachyramphus brevirostris (Vigors, 1829)

= Kittlitz's murrelet =

Species of bird

Kittlitz's murrelet (Brachyramphus brevirostris) is a small alcid found in the waters off Alaska and Eastern Siberia. This near threatened species is, like the closely related marbled murrelet, unusual for seabirds in not being colonial, nesting instead in isolated locations on mountain tops, where the nests were known to Native Americans for many years before skeptical ornithologists described and photographed them. It is a poorly known and little studied species, although concern over its status and that of the closely related marbled murrelet has led to a recent increase in research.

The common name of this species commemorates the German zoologist Heinrich von Kittlitz, who first collected this species.

== Description and range ==
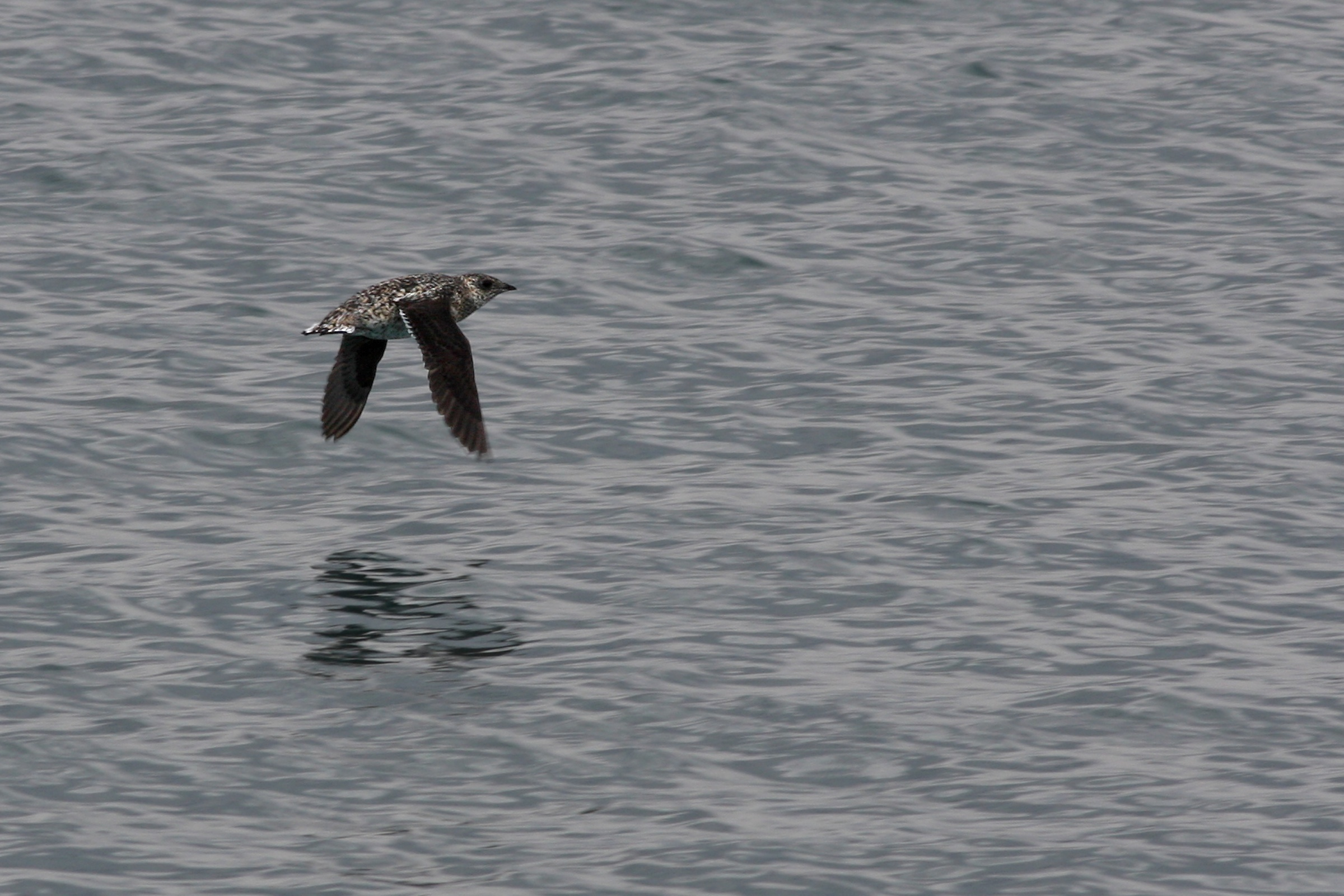
Kittlitz's murrelet in flight

The Kittlitz's murrelet is, like the marbled murrelet, a small compact auk, 25 cm (9.8 in) long with tiny legs and cryptic plumage during the breeding season. The colour of the breeding plumage, greyish-brown, reflects its habit of breeding on bare ground near snowfields. In the winter, it adopts the black and white plumage typical of many seabirds. Its bill is smaller than that of the marbled murrelet.

The Kittlitz's murrelet mostly breeds and lives in the coastal areas of Alaska, both on the mainland around Prince William Sound, the Kenai Peninsula, sparsely up the west coast and along the Aleutian Islands. It also nests in Siberia and possibly Wrangel Island.

== Behaviour ==
The Kittlitz's murrelet feeds close to the shore, in particular in the waters around tidewater glaciers. It feeds on larval fish, krill and other small zooplankton. Chicks are fed with slightly larger fish carried in the bill.

The Kittlitz's murrelet is one of the least known auks, although it is known not to be colonial, nesting instead above the tree line on mountains inland from the sea. The nests are situated on south facing slopes on bare ground, often close to snow. A single egg is laid (and incubated for an unknown amount of time). Chicks are fed throughout the day, and reach fledging weight in around 25 days. The exposed nature of the nesting grounds mean that chicks keep their downy feathers later than most other birds, losing the down 12 hours before they fledge. It is assumed that they fly to sea on fledging, but it has also been suggested that they reach the seas through rivers. After the chick fledges it is thought to receive no further parental care, no chick has ever been seen with an adult at sea.

== Threats ==
Until 2014, the Kittlitz's murrelet was considered to be critically endangered by the International Union for Conservation of Nature (IUCN), based on dramatic declines at every site studies. However, in 2014, the IUCN downlisted the murrelet's status from critically endangered to near threatened, as more recent studies indicate that declines appear to be happening at a less rapid rate than was previously thought; some populations appear to be stabilizing or recovering slightly. The species is not listed under the Endangered Species Act, though it was a Species of Conservation Concern until that category was abolished. It is threatened by habitat loss from global warming (as it is seemingly dependent on retreating glaciers), disturbance by boats and oil spills. An estimated 5–10% of the world population was killed during the Exxon Valdez oil spill.
