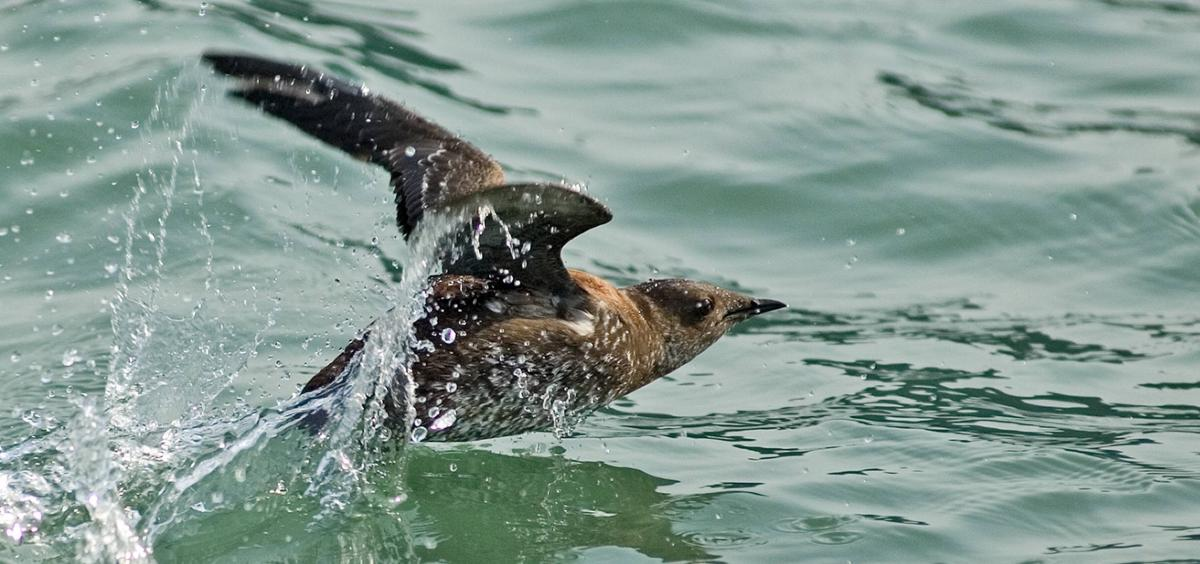

Conservation status
- Endangered (IUCN 3.1)

- Threatened (ESA)

Scientific classification
- Kingdom: Animalia
- Phylum: Chordata
- Class: Aves
- Order: Charadriiformes
- Family: Alcidae
- Genus: Brachyramphus
- Species: B. marmoratus

Binomial name
- Brachyramphus marmoratus (Gmelin, JF, 1789)
- Breeding Year-round Nonbreeding

= Marbled murrelet =

Species of bird

The marbled murrelet (Brachyramphus marmoratus) is a small seabird from the North Pacific. It is a member of the family Alcidae, which includes auklets, guillemots, murres and puffins. It nests in old-growth forests or on the ground at higher latitudes where trees cannot grow. Its population has declined since humans began logging its nest trees in the latter half of the 19th century. The decline of the marbled murrelet and its association with old-growth forests—at least in the southern part of its range—have made it a flagship species in the forest protection movement.

== Taxonomy ==
The marbled murrelet was formally described in 1789 by the German naturalist Johann Friedrich Gmelin in his revised and expanded edition of Carl Linnaeus's Systema Naturae. He placed it with the grebes and loons in the genus Colymbus and coined the binomial name Colymbus marmoratus. Gmelin based his description on the "marbled murrelet" that had been described and illustrated in 1785 by both the English ornithologist John Latham and by the Welsh naturalist Thomas Pennant. Both authors mention the two specimens in the Leverian Museum that had been collected in Prince William Sound during James Cook's third voyage to the Pacific Ocean. Cook described the birds in his account of the voyage.

It is about the size of a partridge; has a short, black, compressed bill; with the head and upper part of the neck of a brown black; the rest of a deep brown, obscurely waved with black, except the underpart, which is entirely of a blackish cast, very minutely varied with white; the other (perhaps the female) is blacker above, and whiter below.

The marbled murrelet is now one of three species placed in the genus Brachyramphus that was introduced in 1837 by the German born naturalist Johann Friedrich von Brandt. The genus name combines Ancient Greek brakhus meaning "short" with rhamphos meaning "bill". The specific epithet marmoratus is Latin meaning "marbled". The species is monotypic: no subspecies are recognised.

The long-billed murrelet was formerly considered conspecific with the marbled murrelet. A molecular phylogenetic study published in 1998 found that the mitochondrial DNA variation was greater between these two forms than between the marbled murrelet and Kittlitz's murrelet.

== Description ==
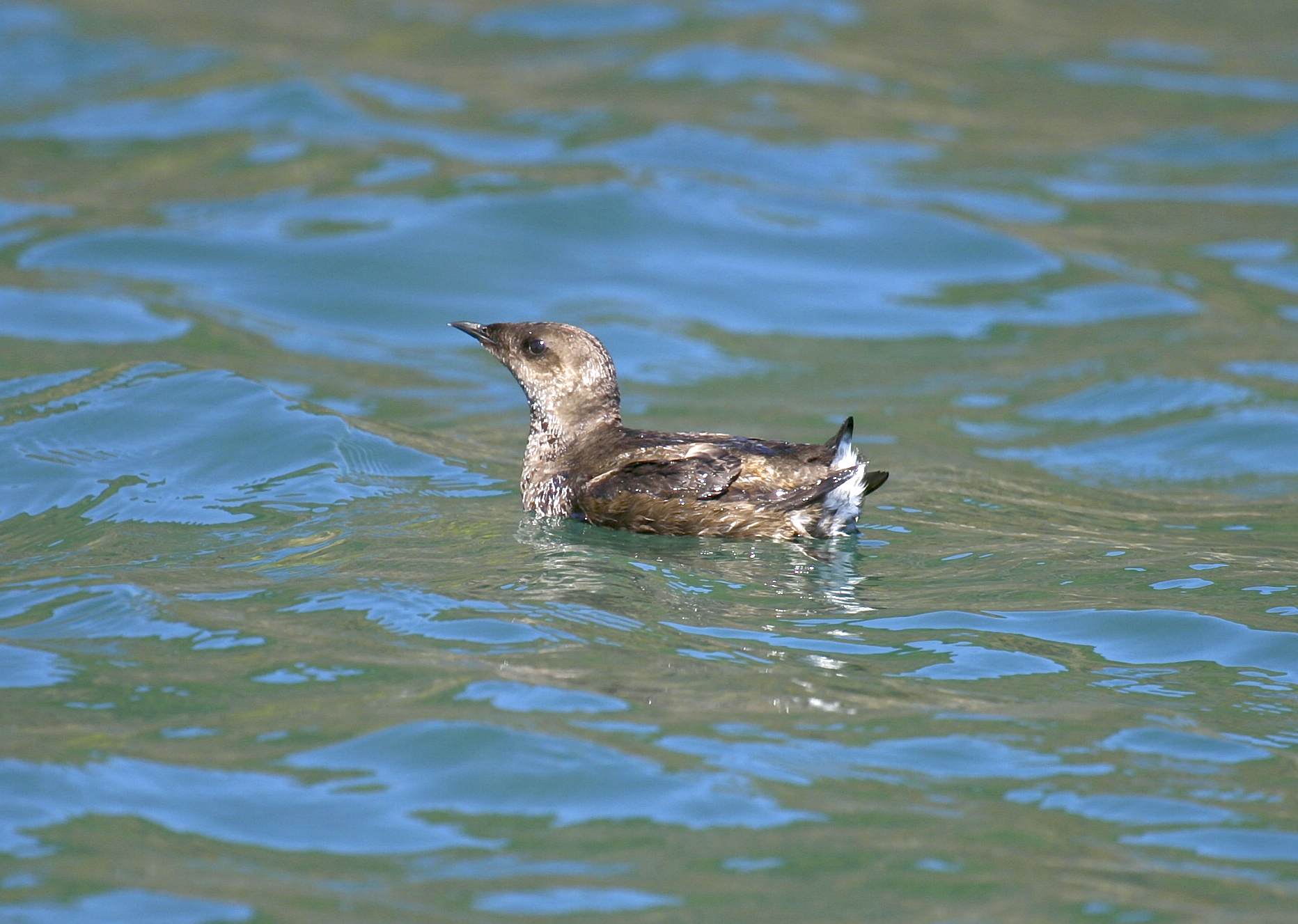
Adult Marbled Murrelet on the Oregon Coast adjacent to Oregon Islands National Wildlife Refuge, OR Photo: Roy W. Lowe/USFWS

The marbled murrelet is a small (25 cm), chunky auk with a slender black bill. It has pointed wings and plumage that varies by season. The non-breeding plumage is typically white underneath with a black crown, nape, wings and back. The bird closely resembles its congener, the long-billed murrelet; in fact, these species were considered conspecific up until 1998. In breeding plumage, both have a brown mottled body and face. The long-billed has a pale white throat which is lacking in the marbled. In winter plumage, the marbled murrelet has a white neck collar, absent in long-billed. The marbled murrelet is shorter-billed and slightly smaller than the long-billed murrelet.

== Distribution and habitat ==
Marbled murrelets occur in summer from Alaska's Kenai Peninsula, Barren islands, and Aleutian Islands south along the coast of North America to Point Sal, Santa Barbara County, in south-central California. They winter mostly within the same general area, except that they tend to vacate the most northern sections of their range, especially where ice forms on the surface of the fiords. They have been recorded as far south as Imperial Beach of San Diego County, California.

They are coastal birds that occur mainly near saltwater within 1.2 miles (2 km) of shore. However, they have been found up to 59 miles (95 km) inland in Washington, 35 miles (56 km) inland in Oregon, 22 miles (37 km) inland in northern California, and 11 miles (18 km) inland in central California. Over 90% of all marbled murrelet observations in the northern Washington Cascades were within 37 miles (60 km) of the coast. In Oregon, they are observed most often within 12 miles (20 km) of the ocean. Many marbled murrelets regularly visit coastal lakes. Most lakes used by the birds are within 12 miles (20 km) of the ocean, but a few birds have been found at lakes as far inland as 47 miles (75 km). All lakes used by marbled murrelets occur within potential nesting habitat.

=== Nesting habitat ===
From southeast Alaska southward, marbled murrelets use mature or old-growth forest stands near the coastline for nesting. These forests are generally characterized by large trees (>32 inches [80 cm] diameter at breast height (d.b.h.)), a multistoried canopy, moderate to high canopy closure or an open crown canopy, large snags, and numerous downed snags in all stages of decay. Marbled murrelets tend to nest in the oldest trees in the stand. In Oregon, forests begin to exhibit old-growth characteristics at about 175 to 250 years of age. Moss, on which marbled murrelets nest, forms on the limbs of Douglas-fir that are more than 150 years old.

The four tree nests found before 1990 shared the following characteristics: (1) located in a large tree (>47 inches [120 cm] d.b.h.) with an open crown structure, (2) on a moss-covered limb that is camouflaged, partially shaded, and approximately horizontal with a diameter (including associated moss) of at least 14 inches (36 cm), and (3) located within the middle or lower part of a live crown. However, Marshall stated that because of their low aerial buoyancy marbled murrelets often nest high in the treetops or on steep slopes. Habitat must be sufficiently open to allow for easy flight. All marbled murrelet nests found in Washington, Oregon, and California were located in old-growth trees that ranged from 38 inches (88 cm) d.b.h. to 210 inches (533 cm) d.b.h. with a mean of 80 inches (203 cm) d.b.h. Nests were located high above the ground and had good overhead protection but allowed easy access to the exterior forest. It was initially believed that marbled murrelets might use the same nest in successive years but there has been little evidence of this.

Stand size is also important in nest sites. Marbled murrelets more commonly occupy stands greater than 500 acres (202 ha) than stands less than 100 acres (40 ha). However, they may nest in remnant old-growth trees or groves that are surrounded by younger trees. In California, marbled murrelets are usually absent from stands less than 60 acres (24 ha) in size. In Washington, marbled murrelets are found more often when old-growth and mature forests make up over 30% of the landscape. Fewer marbled murrelets are found when clearcut and meadow areas make up more than 25% of the landscape. Concentrations of marbled murrelets offshore are almost always adjacent to old-growth or mature forests onshore, although marbled murrelets may not use the interior of dense stands.

Where large trees are absent in the northern parts of marbled murrelet range, marbled murrelets nest in depressions on the ground, in rock cavities on the ground, or on rock outcrops. Marbled murrelets are both ground nesters and tree nesters where forests and treeless areas meet.

In northern regions where coniferous forests nest sites are unavailable, marbled murrelets occupy alpine or tundra near the ocean. In Washington and Oregon, they commonly nest in Douglas-fir (Pseudotsuga menziesii) dominated stands. They also select stands dominated by mountain hemlock (Tsuga mertensiana), western redcedar (Thuja plicata), and Sitka spruce (Picea sitchensis) for nesting. In California, nests are most often located in redwood (Sequoia sempervirens) dominated stands with scattered Sitka spruce, western hemlock (Tsuga heterophylla) and Douglas-fir. Marbled murrelets also occur in stands dominated by Port-Orford-cedar (Chamaecyparis lawsoniana).

=== Foraging habitat ===
Marbled murrelets forage in the ocean near shore and in inland saltwater areas such as bays, sounds, and saltwater passageways. Some also forage on inland freshwater lakes. Flocks of 50 or more birds have been observed near freshwater lakes. Subadults occur at sea throughout the summer. Marbled murrelets feed within 1,640 feet (500 m) of shore.

=== Winter habitat ===
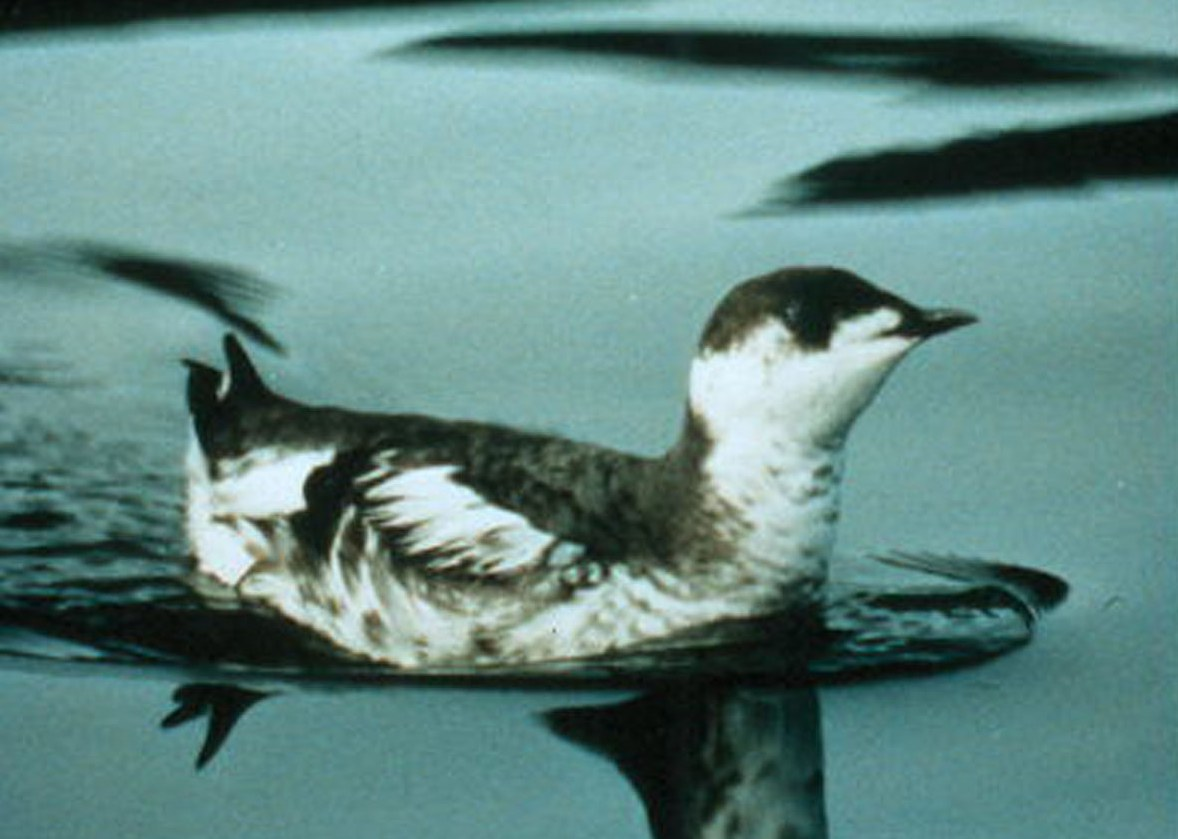
Marbled Murrelet (Brachyramphus marmoratus) showing winter plumage

Marbled murrelet winter habitat is the same as the nesting and foraging habitat. During the winter marbled murrelets use inland old-growth or mature sites for roosting, courtship, and investigating nest sites. The use of inland lakes during the nonbreeding season occurs in conjunction with visits to nesting areas.

== Behavior ==
=== Food and feeding ===
The marbled murrelet feeds at sea both in pelagic offshore areas (often associating with upwellings) and inshore in protected bays and fiords. The bird has not been known to wander from the Pacific coast of North America, all inland and eastern Brachyramphus records being of the closely related long-billed murrelet.

They feed below the water surface on small fish and invertebrates. Some principal foods include sand lance (Ammodytes hexapterus), Pacific herring (Clupea haringus), capelin (Mallotus villosus), shiner perch, and the invertebrates Euphausia pacifica and Thysanoessa spinifera.

They often forage in pairs but do not feed in large flocks as do other alcids. Loose aggregations of 500 or more birds occasionally occur in winter. Subadults feed singly; but in early July, when pairs of adults are still feeding young, mixed flocks begin to form. Marbled murrelets feed during the day and at night.

=== Breeding ===
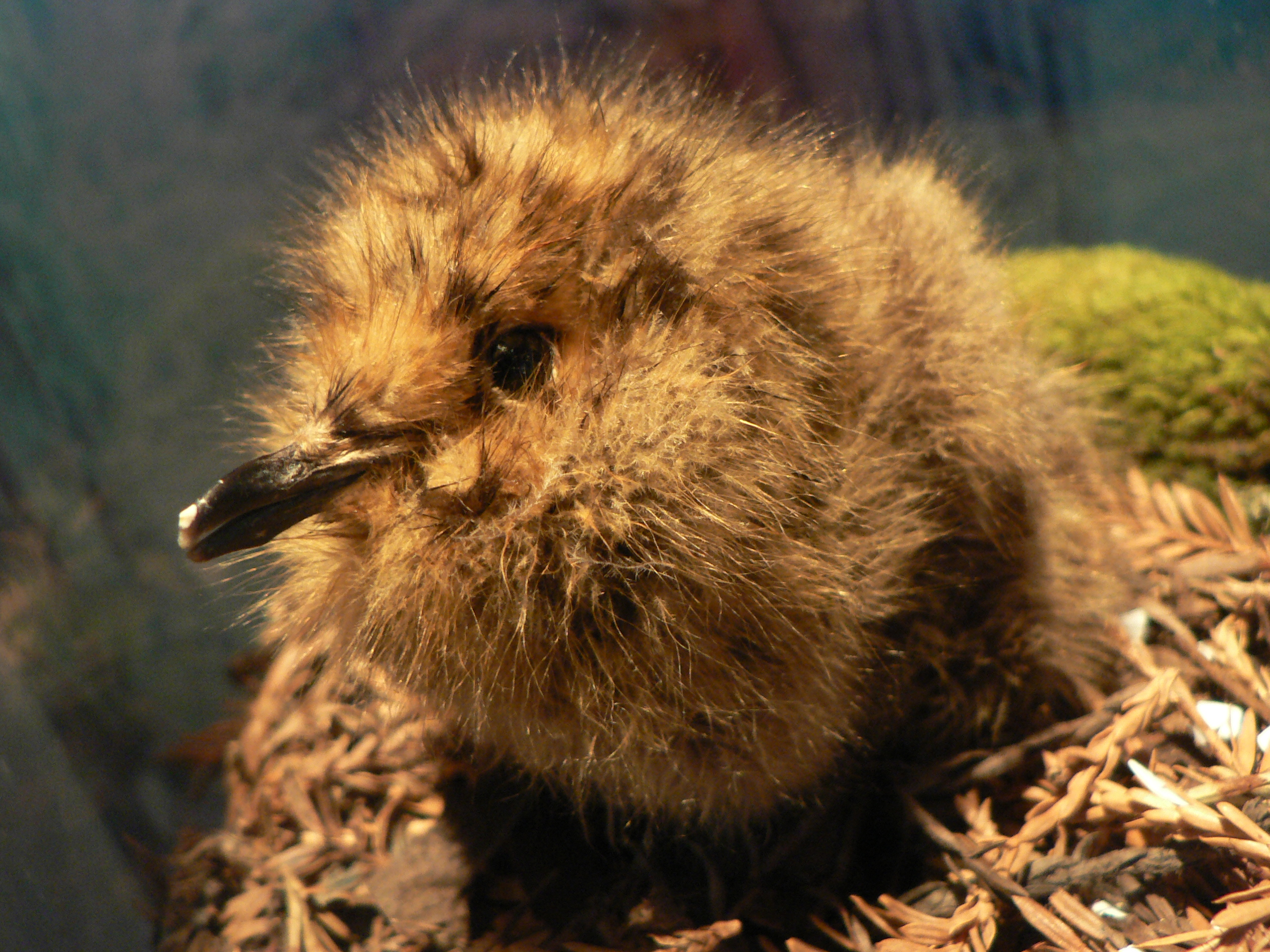
Marbled murrelet chick (taxidermy)

The nesting behavior of the marbled murrelet is unusual, since unlike most alcids it does not nest in colonies on cliffs or in burrows, but on branches of old-growth and mature conifers such as western hemlock, Sitka spruce, Douglas-fir and coastal redwood, as far as 80 km inland. It lays one egg on a platform of lichen or moss on these branches (less often on the ground). In northern populations, murrelets nest on the ground among rocks, as do other related murrelet species. The egg is incubated for a month, then fed for around 40 days until the chick is able to fledge. Adults fly from ocean feeding areas to inland nest sites, mostly at dusk and dawn. They feed nestlings at least once and sometimes twice per day or night. Usually only one fish is carried to the young. The chick then leaves the nest and flies unaccompanied to the sea. Breeding success is low and chick mortality high.

Marbled murrelets do not breed until they are at least two years old. They nest from mid-April to late September. Peak activity occurs from mid-June to late July in California, and the second week of July to mid-August in Oregon. Marbled murrelets are semicolonial in nesting habits. Two nests found in Washington were located only 150 feet (46 m) apart. Not all mature adults nest every year. The clutch is a single egg. The nestlings fledge in 28 days. The young remain in the nest longer than other alcids and molt into their juvenile plumage before leaving the nest. Fledglings fly directly from the nest to the ocean.

== Predators ==
Steller's jays (Cyanocitta stelleri) and common ravens (Corvus corax) prey on marbled murrelet eggs and nestlings.

== Status and Conservation ==
=== Status ===
The marbled murrelet is considered globally endangered. The IUCN Red List lists their population as declining.

=== Conservation ===
Marbled murrelet populations are affected by many environmental processes. Cooler ocean temperatures along with high availability of their prey increases their reproductive success. Loss of their nesting habitat in old-growth trees along with the warming ocean temperatures have serious negative impacts on murrelet populations. Human activity such as commercial fishing, increased boat traffic and pollution decrease the marbled murrelet non-breeding distribution. Conservation of their inland nesting habitat and their marine breeding and foraging habitats is therefore important.

The Northwest Forest Plan (NWFP) aims at stabilizing the marbled murrelet population via maintaining and increasing their nesting habitat. The population was monitored from 2000 to 2018 and was found to have declined in Washington but increased in Oregon and northern California. This decline in the north could be attributed to habitat loss, long nest-to-sea commutes, or poor foraging habitats in Washington.

Scientists at Redwood National Park have established a connection between human presence in marbled murrelet territory and corvid predation of marbled murrelet chicks.

== See also ==
- Seabirds
- Flagship Species
- IUCN Red List
- Northwest Forest Plan
