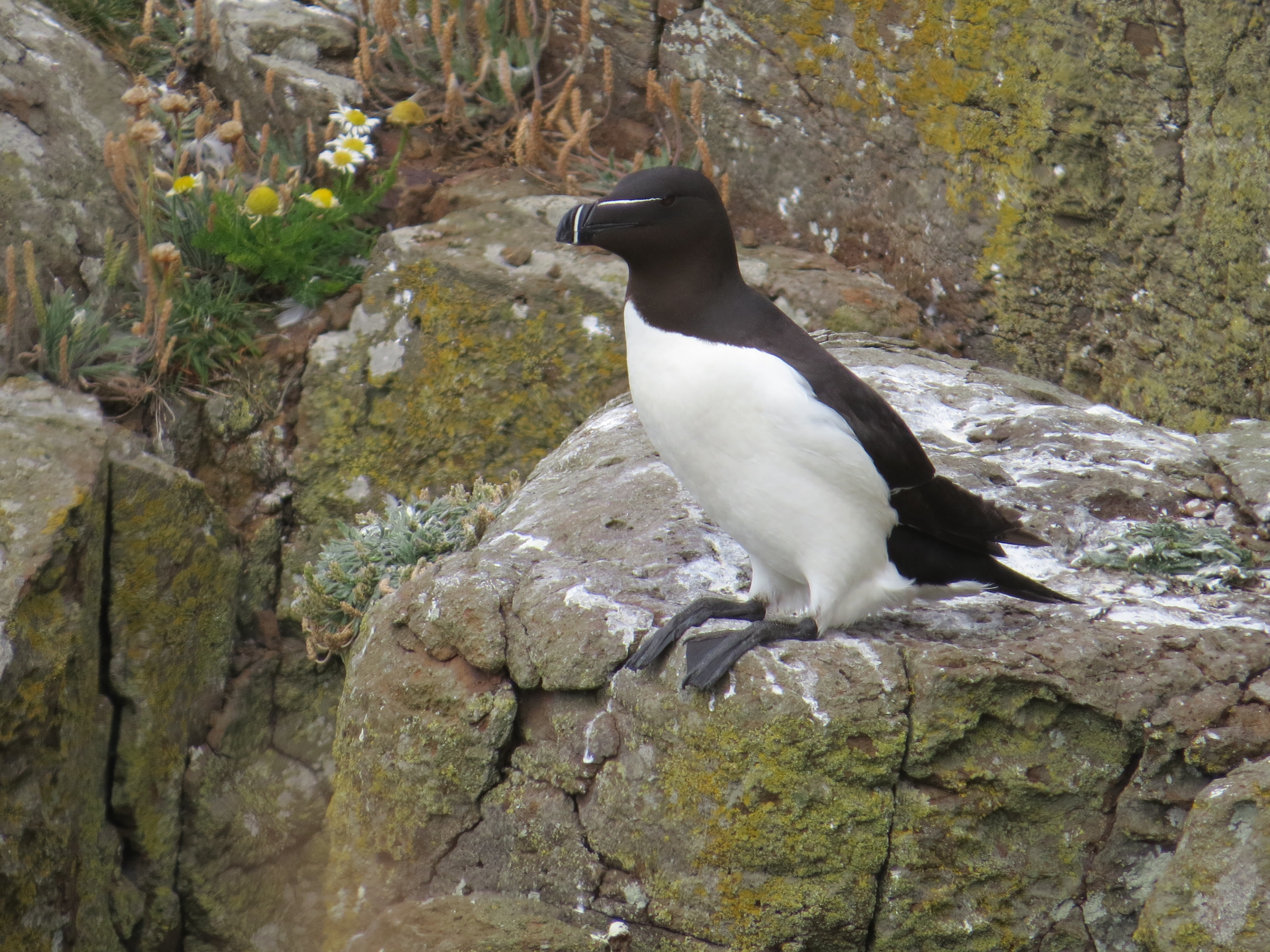
- Razorbill (Alca torda)

Scientific classification
- Kingdom: Animalia
- Phylum: Chordata
- Class: Aves
- Order: Charadriiformes
- Family: Alcidae
- Tribe: Alcini
- Genus: Alca; Linnaeus, 1758

Species
- Alca torda; †Alca ausonia; †Alca carolinensis; †Alca grandis; †Alca minor; †Alca olsoni; †Alca stewarti

= Alca (bird) =

Alca Temporal range: Miocene - Recent

Genus of bird

Alca is a genus of charadriiform bird that contains a single extant species, the razorbill (Alca torda). Many fossil species are known, the oldest dating back to the Miocene. The genus appears to have always been restricted to the North Atlantic.
