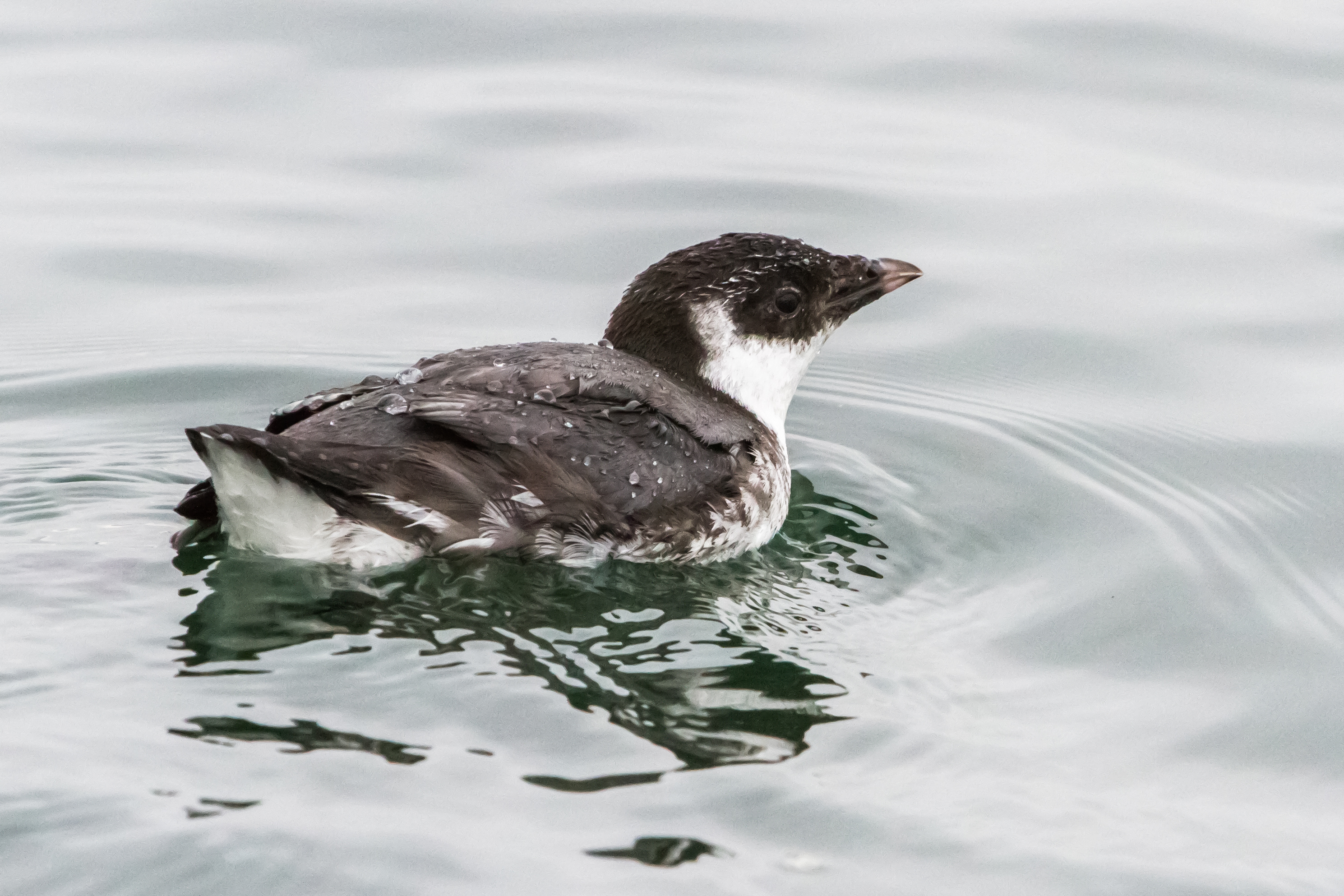

Conservation status
- Least Concern (IUCN 3.1)

Scientific classification
- Kingdom: Animalia
- Phylum: Chordata
- Class: Aves
- Order: Charadriiformes
- Family: Alcidae
- Genus: Synthliboramphus
- Species: S. antiquus

Binomial name
- Synthliboramphus antiquus (Gmelin, JF, 1789)

Subspecies
- S. a. antiquus; S. a. microrhynchos
- Breeding Year-round Nonbreeding

= Ancient murrelet =

Species of bird

The ancient murrelet (Synthliboramphus antiquus) is a bird in the auk family. The English term "murrelet" is a diminutive of "murre", a word of uncertain origins, but which may imitate the call of the common guillemot. Ancient murrelets are called "ancient" because they have grey on the back like a shawl, as worn by the elderly.

== Taxonomy ==
The ancient murrelet was formally described in 1789 by the German naturalist Johann Friedrich Gmelin in his revised and expanded edition of Carl Linnaeus's Systema Naturae. He placed it with the auks in the genus Alca and coined the binomial name Alca antiqua. Gmelin based his description on the "ancient auk" that had been described in 1785 by both the English ornithologist John Latham and the Welsh naturalist Thomas Pennant. Both authors mention a specimen in the Leverian Museum and give the location as the west of North America, the Kuril Islands and the Kamchatka Peninsula. The ancient murrelet is now one of five species placed in the genus Synthliboramphus that was introduced in 1837 by the German-born naturalist Johann Friedrich von Brandt. The genus name combines Ancient Greek sunthlibō meaning "to compress" with rhamphos meaning "bill". The specific epithet antiquus is Latin meaning "ancient".

Two subspecies are recognised:

- S. a. antiquus (Gmelin, JF, 1789) – northeast Asia, Aleutian Islands to western Canada
- S. a. microrhynchos – Stepanyan, 1972 – Commander Islands (eastern Russia)

== Description ==
This small auk species is black on the head, throat and rear neck, grey-backed, and has white underparts. The yellow bill is short and stubby. It has a small rounded black tail. The summer adults have white head streaks giving an aged look and leading to the English name. Other plumages are similar, but lack the crown streaks and black on the throat.

Ancient murrelets tend to bank from side to side in flight to a greater extent than other small auks. They fly with fast wing beats due to their short wings.

Measurements:

- Length: 7.9–9.4 in (20–24 cm)
- Weight: 5.4–8.8 oz (150–250 g)
- Wingspan: 17.7–18.1 in (45–46 cm)

== Distribution and habitat ==
It breeds from the Yellow Sea (islands off China), through the Russian Pacific coast and the Aleutian Islands to the Haida Gwaii archipelago of British Columbia, where about half of the world population breeds.

Some ancient murrelets migrate 8,000 kilometres (5,000 mi) from Canada to winter near Japan and China, even though the climate is similar at the two ends. It is the only bird known to cross the whole North Pacific. They then start a return trip in February, flying four or five hours a day. Genetic evidence shows that the species originated in Asia and only recently colonized North America, so their migration takes them back to their original homeland. In 2007, surveys off the Olympic Peninsula found unprecedented numbers of Ancient Murrelets with chicks, strongly implying local breeding.

Other ancient murrelets however fly south in winter as far as California, and odd birds are found inland in North America, carried by autumn storms. The most remarkable record of this relatively short-distance Pacific migrant was a bird found on the island of Lundy, in Devon, England in the spring of 1990. Even more remarkably, what was presumably the same bird returned to this British island for the next two springs as well. In 2021 murrelets were sighted in Finland.

== Behavior ==
=== Diet and feeding ===
Like other auks, ancient murrelets forage by swimming underwater using their wings for propulsion. Their diet is poorly known. In winter it consists mainly of crustacea, while in summer both small fish and crustaceans are taken. Based on stable isotope analysis, their diet in Haida Gwaii seems to consist primarily of small mesopelagic fish.

=== Breeding ===
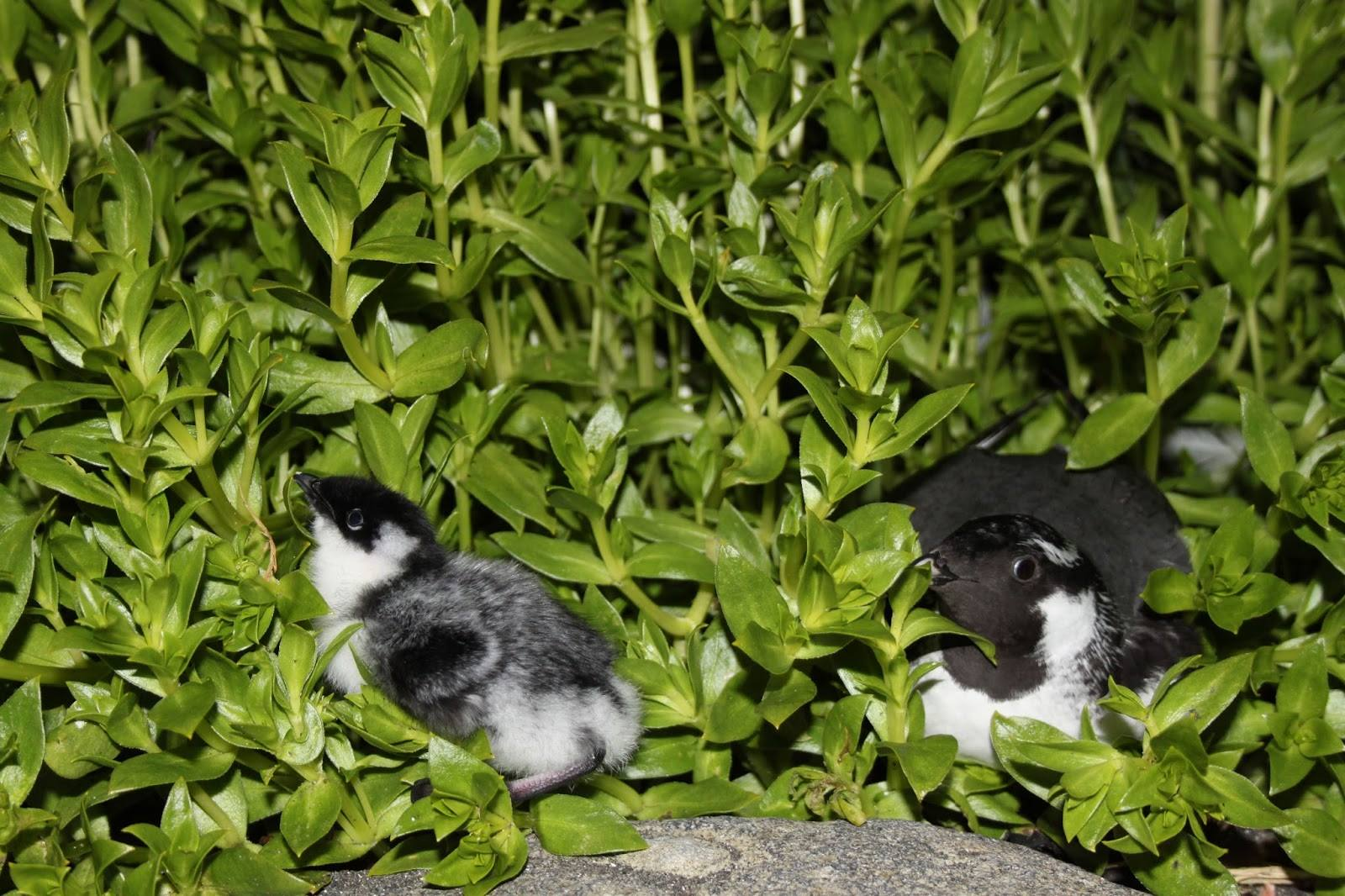
Adult and chick, Alaska Maritime National Wildlife Refuge

Ancient murrelets nest in colonies on islands in the north Pacific, mainly off the coast of North America, but also near Japan and Kamchatka. One of its largest colonies is on Frederick Island in British Columbia. They lay two eggs (sometimes one) in burrows excavated in forest soil among tree roots, under logs or in grass tussocks, occasionally in rock crevices. They arrive at and depart from their nesting grounds at night, presumably to reduce predation, and perhaps for the same reason the young are never fed at the nest, being taken to sea 1–3 days after hatching. The parents and young recognise one another by call and after the chicks have run from the burrow to the sea, they locate their parents by call and the entire family swims immediately out to sea. The family continues to move away from land, usually at night, and will travel a long distance, typically up to 30 mi (48 km), for at least twelve hours. After that, the young are fed exclusively at sea by their parents for more than a month. This species spends less time on land than any other bird.

== Status and conservation ==
The ancient murrelet is listed as of 'Special Concern' by the committee on the Status of Endangered Wildlife in Canada because populations have been greatly reduced over the past century by mammalian predators such as rats introduced to their breeding islands by visiting ships in the 1800s. On one island, the number of breeding pairs was reduced from 200,000 pre-infestation to about 14,000 in the 21st century.

In 2009, a five-year $2.5m Night Birds Returning project was instituted by Parks Canada, Haida Nation, Island Conservation and Coastal Conservation to restore Murrelet population by eradicating rats in the Gwaii Haanas National Park Reserve and Haida Heritage Site. For success, every single rat needs to be killed as a single pregnant rat can repopulate an island in 1–2 years. In 2011, ground-based eradication was implemented on Arichika and Bischoff islands. Phase 2 consisted of using aerial drops of poisoned pellets selectively attractive to rats. This was conducted in fall of 2013 on Murchison and Faraday islands. Continued monitoring is required for two years before an area can be declared rat-free.
