= Bruce McMillan =

American writer

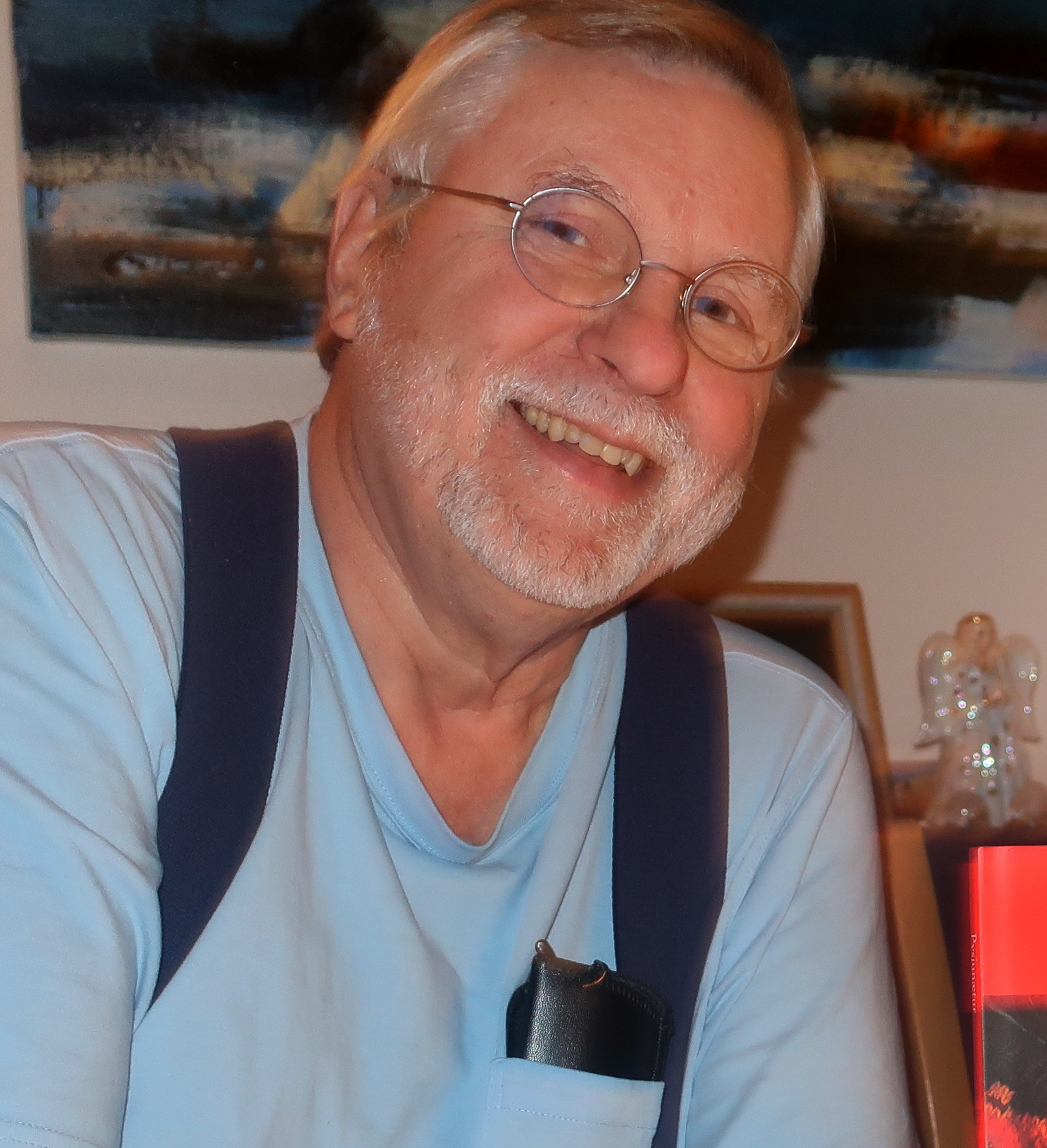
Portrait of Bruce McMillan

Bruce McMillan (May 10, 1947- ) is a contemporary American author of children books, photo-illustrator and watercolor artist living in Shapleigh, Maine. Born in Massachusetts, he grew up in Bangor, and Kennebunk, Maine. He received a degree in biology from the University of Maine. In addition to his 45 children's books, seven of them set in Iceland, he has authored two books of humor, Punography, featured in Life magazine, and Punography Too. His interest in biology is often reflected in his books' topics. He has published three genres of children's picture books - concept books, nonfiction, and fiction. In 2006, he was honored by the Maine Library Association with the Katahdin Award honoring his outstanding body of work of children's literature in Maine.

McMillan's watercolor art has been in numerous juried shows in New England and Iceland. His 2018 Winter Olympics curling watercolors were a two-page feature in the Maine Sunday Telegram Arts Section. His watercolor Browns Head Light Vinalhaven was Best in Show at the Port Clyde (Maine) Art Gallery Third Annual Invitational 10 x 10 Show in 2017. His watercolors are in private collections in the US, Canada, Iceland, and Switzerland.

McMillan's most noted award-winning children's book is Nights of the Pufflings (1995), set on the Icelandic island of Heimaey. The story introduces a local children's tradition of rescuing young birds, pufflings (a name he coined), which take their first flight on August nights, some stranded in the village streets. The children then set them free at the beach at daytime. His books were the first photo-illustrated children's books ever featured on the covers of The Bulletin for the Center of Children's Books (Nights of the Pufflings), The Horn Book Guide (Nights of the Pufflings), and Booklinks magazine (Mary Had a Little Lamb).

McMillan was honored with a permanent corner in the Springvale Public Library's Children's Room, The Bruce McMillan Corner, where nine of his original photo-illustrations from Grandfather's Trolley are on permanent display.

McMillan has taught writing, illustrating, and publishing children's picture books for the Professional Development division open to the public at the University of Southern Maine and the University of New Hampshire (where he taught for 40 years), with students successfully published by major US publishers. He has spoken at hundreds of schools and conferences in the US.

Several of McMillan's children's books were translated into other languages - Icelandic, German and Korean. Hand-colored original photo-illustrations from Grandfather's Trolley are in the public collections of the Mazza Collection, University of Findlay, Findlay, Ohio, Keene State College original children's art collection in Keene, New Hampshire, the Kennebunk Free Library in Kennebunk, Maine (his teen-years library), and the Springvale Public Library in Springvale, Maine (his adult-years library).

"My publishing success with books, creating those playful learning tools for children, as a writer, as a photographer, as a teacher, has its roots in the patient, almost invisible, nurturing from boy to adult of my wise father, Frank Harold McMillan, Jr." -Bruce McMillan, November 7, 2021

Bruce McMillan was twice married, Valeria Therese "Terry" Loughran McMillan, 1968-1985, and Lori Beth Evans, 1997-2001. He has one son, Brett Brownrigg McMillan (1969- ) and two grandsons, Finn (2002- ) and Teague (2004- ).

== Children's books ==
- How the Ladies Stopped the Wind, Houghton Mifflin, 2007 (illustrated by Gunnella)
- The Problem with Chickens, Houghton Mifflin, Salka, 2005 (illustrated by Gunnella)
- Going Fishing, Houghton Mifflin, Salka, 2005
- Days of the Ducklings, Houghton Mifflin, 2001
- Gletta the Foal, Cavendish, 1998
- Salmon Summer, Houghton Mifflin, 1998
- Wild Flamingos, Houghton Mifflin, 1997
- My Horse of the North, Scholastic, 1997
- The Picture that Mom Drew, Walker, 1997 - by Mallat and McMillan
- Jelly Beans for Sale, Scholastic, 1996
- Grandfather's Trolley, Candlewick, 1995
- Summer Ice: Life along the Antarctic Peninsula, Houghton Mifflin, 1995
- Puffins Climb, Penguins Rhyme, Harcourt, 1995
- Nights of the Pufflings, Houghton Mifflin, 1995
- Sense Suspense: A Guessing Game for the Five Senses, Scholastic, 1994
- Penguins at Home: Gentoos of Antarctica, Houghton Mifflin, 1993
- A Beach for the Birds. Houghton Mifflin, 1993
- Mouse Views: What the Class Pet Saw , Holiday House, 1993
- Going on a Whale Watch, Scholastic, 1992
- Beach Ball - Left Right, Holiday House, 1992 and Apple Island Books, 1998
- The Baby Zoo, Scholastic, 1992 and Apple Island Books, 1998
- Eating Fractions, Scholastic, 1991
- Play Day: A Book of Terse Verse, Holiday House, 1991 and Apple Island Books, 1998
- The Weather Sky, Farrar, Straus, Giroux, 1991
- One Two One Pair!, Scholastic, 1991 and Apple Island Books
- Mary Had a Little Lamb, Scholastic, 1990 and Apple Island Books, 1998
- One Sun: A Book of Terse Verse, Holiday House, 1990 and Apple Island Books, 1998
- Time To..., Scholastic, 1989
- Everything Grows, Crown, 1989
- Super, Super, Superwords, Lothrop, Lee & Shepard, 1989
- Fire Engine Shapes, Lothrop, Lee & Shepard, 1988
- Growing Colors, Lothrop, Lee & Shepard, 1988 and Apple Island Books
- Dry or Wet?, Lothrop, Lee & Shepard, 1988
- Step by Step, Lothrop, Lee & Shepard, 1987 and Apple Island Books, 1995
- Becca Backward, Becca Frontward: A Book of Concept Pairs, Lothrop, Lee & Shepard, 1986
- Counting Wildflowers, Lothrop, Lee & Shepard, 1986
- Kitten Can..., Lothrop, Lee & Shepard, 1984
- Here a Chick, There a Chick, Lothrop, Lee & Shepard, 1983
- Ghost Doll, Houghton Mifflin, 1983 and Apple Island Books, 1997
- Puniddles, Houghton Mifflin, 1982
- Making Sneakers, Houghton Mifflin, 1980
- Apples: How They Grow, Houghton Mifflin, 1979 and Apple Island Books
- The Remarkable Riderless Runaway Tricycle, Houghton Mifflin, 1978 and Apple Island Books, 1978
- The Alphabet Symphony, Greenwillow, 1977 and Apple Island Books, 1978
- Finestkind o' Day: Lobstering in Maine, Lippincott, 1977 and DownEast, 1978

== Humor books ==
- Punography Too, Penguin Books, 1980
- Punography, Penguin Books, 1978

== Icelandic books (published in Iceland) ==
- Puffins from the Other Side of Iceland, Salka, 2006
- Postcards from the Other Side of Iceland: Where the Grass is Greener, Salka, 2006

== Children's book awards ==
American Library Association Notable books	Jelly Beans for Sale, Nights of the Pufflings, Eating Fractions, One Sun, A Book of Terse Verse, Counting Wildflowers
School Library Journal starred reviews	The Problem with Chickens, Wild Flamingos, Nights of the Pufflings, Sense Suspense, A Guessing Game for the Five Senses, Eating Fractions, Mary Had a Little Lamb, Time To..., Super, Super, Superwords, Dry or Wet?, Becca Backward, Becca Frontward, A Book of Concept Pairs, Counting Wildflowers, Here a Chick, There a Chick
American Library Association Booklist starred reviews	The Picture that Mom Drew, Mouse Views, What the Class Pet Saw, Super, Super, Superwords, Growing Colors, Becca Backward, Becca Frontward, A Book of Concept Pairs
Publishers Weekly starred review	The Problem with Chickens
Kirkus pointer review	A Beach for the Birds, Going on a Whale Watch
The Bulletin of the Center for Children's Books starred reviews	Nights of the Pufflings, One Sun, A Book of Terse Verse
Science Books and Films double-starred reviews	Puffins Climb, Penguins Rhyme, Penguins at Home, Gentoos of Antarctica
Children's Book Committee, Bank Street College of Education star	Days of the Ducklings
The Horn Book Guide triangle review	Days of the Ducklings, Play Day, A Book of Terse Verse
A Publishers Weekly Best Children's Book of the Year	The Problem with Chickens
A New York Times Best Illustrated Picture Book of the Year	The Problem with Chickens
A John Burroughs Nature Book for Young Readers Certificate of Commendation	A Beach for the Birds
An Outstanding Science Trade Book for Children, National Science Teachers' Association / Children's Book Council	Wild Flamingos, Summer Ice, Life along the Antarctic Peninsula, Nights of the Pufflings, Puffins Climb, Penguins Rhyme, A Beach for the Birds, Going on a Whale Watch, The Baby Zoo, One Sun, A Book of Terse Verse, Becca Backward, Becca Frontward, A Book of Concept Pairs
A National Council for the Social Studies - Children's Book Council, Notable Social Studies Trade Book	Going Fishing
Certificate of Excellence, Parenting magazine	Nights of the Pufflings, One, Two - One Pair!, Mary Had a Little Lamb, Super, Super, Superwords
A Best Kid's Book - Parents Magazine	Eating Fractions, Play Day, A Book of Terse Verse, One Sun, A Book of Terse Verse, Here a Chick, There a Chick
A Best Book of the Year, School Library Journal	Nights of the Pufflings, Super, Super, Superwords
A Best Kids' Book of the Year, Crayola Kids magazine	Nights of the Pufflings
A Children's Book of Distinction, Hungry Mind Review	Nights of the Pufflings
Parents Choice Honor Book	Nights of the Pufflings
American Bookseller Association Pick of the List	Wild Flamingos, Puffins Climb, Penguins Rhyme, Sense Suspense, A Guessing Game for the Five Senses, The Baby Zoo, Kitten Can..., Here a Chick, There a Chick
A Blue Ribbon Book, The Bulletin for the Center of Children's Books	Nights of the Pufflings
A Lupine Honor Book - Maine Librarians' Association	Nights of the Pufflings
A Few Good Books selection - Booklinks magazine	Nights of the Pufflings
A Reading Rainbow review selection	Mouse Views: What the Class Pet Saw
Junior Library Guild selections	Mouse Views, What the Class Pet Saw, Mary Had a Little Lamb, One Sun, A Book of Terse Verse, Here a Chick, There a Chick
Scientific American magazine Young Readers Book Award	The Weather Sky
Parent's Guide Children's Media Award, Outstanding Achievement in Nonfiction Honor	Salmon Summer
Library of Congress Children's Book of the Year	The Weather Sky, Kitten Can...
The Original Art Exhibition jury selection, the Society of Illustrators Museum of American Illustration Selection	Mary had a Little Lamb
Children's Editor's Choice, American Library Association Booklist	Growing Colors
A Parent's Choice Foundation Selection, Seal of Approval	The Problem with Chickens
New York Public Library 100 Best Books for Reading and Sharing	Jelly Beans for Sale, Time To...
Chicago Public Library's Best of the Best	Jelly Beans for Sale

Book	Awards
The Problem with Chickens	New York Times Best Illustrated Book of 2005; Parents' Choice Approved Picture Book seal A Publishers Weekly Best Children's Book of 2005 Star Review - School Library Journal, 2005 Star Review - Publishers Weekly, 2005
Days of the Ducklings	Parents' Choice Non-fiction, 2001 A Best Children's Book of the Year 2002, Children's Book Committee at the Bank Street College of Education Star Review, Children's Book Committee Bank Street College of Education, 2002 Triangle Review, the Horn Book Guide, Spring 2002
Jelly Beans for Sale	American Library Association Notable Book, 1997 New York Public Library 100 Best Books for Reading and Sharing, 1996 Chicago Public Library's Best of the Best, 1996
Puffins Climb, Penguins Rhyme	American Bookseller Association Pick of the List, 1995 Outstanding Science Trade Book for Children - National Science Teacher's Association / Children's Book Council, 1995 Two Star Review - Science Books and Films, 1995
Nights of the Pufflings	American Library Association Notable Book, 1996; A Children's Book of Distinction - Hungry Mind Review, 1996; Parents' Choice Picture Book, 1995; Parenting magazine Certificate of Excellence, 1995 A Lupine Honor Book, Maine Librarians' Association, 1996 A Best Book of the Year, School Library Journal, 1995 A Best Kids' Book of the Year, Crayola Kids magazine, 1995 A Few Good Books selection, Booklinks magazine, 95 A Blue Ribbon Book, The Bulletin for the Center of Children's Books, 1995 Star Review, The Bulletin of the Center for Children's Books, 1995 Star Review, School Library Journal, 1995 Outstanding Science Trade Book for Children - National Science Teachers Association / Children's Book Council, 1995 First photo-illustrated book featured on the cover of The Bulletin for the Center of Children's Books, 1995 First photo-illustrated book featured on the cover of The Horn Book Guide
One Sun, A Book of Terse Verse	American Library Association Notable Book, 1991 A Best Kid's Book of 1990 - Parents magazine, 1990 Outstanding Science Trade Book for Children, National Science Teacher's Association / Children's Book Council, 1990 Star Review - The Bulletin of the Center for Children's Books, 1990 Selection - Children's Book-of-the-Month Club, 1990 Selection - Junior Library Guild, 1990
