= Nights of the Pufflings =

Book by Bruce McMillan

- Author: Bruce McMillan
- Illustrator: Bruce McMillan
- Language: English
- Genre: Children's literature
- Publisher: Houghton Mifflin Company
- Publication date: 1995
- Publication place: United States
- Media type: Print (hardcover)
- ISBN: 978-0395708101

Nights of the Pufflings (Houghton Mifflin, 1995) is the thirty-second, and most honored, of the forty-five children's books by Bruce McMillan. It was photo-illustrated by the author on Heimaey island in the Vestmannaeyjar archipelago off the south coast of Iceland. It was the first of seven children's books of the author's children's books set in Iceland, including Days of the Ducklings (Houghton Mifflin, 2001)

Young puffins are known as "pufflings". It is a word coined by the author, since then widely used, but yet to be included in any dictionary.

Nights of the Pufflings was translated into Icelandic (Pysjunaetur) and German (Nächte der kleinen Papageitaucher). In 2001 a contest was held on Vestmannaeyjar to officially name the annual puffling rescue in which the children have been participating for generations. The official name chosen was Pysjueftirlitið með Brúsa Bjargfasta / The Puffling Patrol with Bruce the Rescuer, a nod to Bruce McMillan.

== Awards ==
American Library Association Notable Book, 1996 [3]
A Children's Book of Distinction - Hungry Mind Review, 1996
Parents' Choice Picture Book, 1995 [2]
Parenting magazine Certificate of Excellence, 1995
A Lupine Honor Book, Maine Librarians Association, 1996
A Best Book of the Year, School Library Journal, 1995
A Best Kids' Book of the Year, Crayola Kids magazine, 1995
A Few Good Books selection, Booklinks magazine, [5]
A Blue Ribbon Book, The Bulletin for the Center of Children's Books, 1995
Star Review, The Bulletin of the Center for Children's Books, 1995
Star Review, School Library Journal, 1995
Outstanding Science Trade Book for Children - National Science Teachers Association / Children's Book Council,
First photo-illustrated book featured on the cover of The Bulletin for the Center of Children's Books, 1995
First photo-illustrated book featured on the cover of The Horn Book Guide

== Synopsis ==
Nights of the Pufflings is set on the Icelandic island of Heimaey. The story deals with a local children's tradition of rescuing young birds, pufflings. Every August millions of pufflings leave their burrows in the cliffs and take their first flight at night time. Some of them get confused, presumably by street lights, and get stranded in the village streets, where they can become easy prey for local cats and dogs. The children get ready to take patrols in the night streets, gather the bewildered pufflings in cardboard boxes and later set them free at the beach in daytime. The birds will spend the next year or two at open sea before returning to Heimaey for mating.

== Characters ==
- Halla: the main figure, a school girl and a puffling rescuer.
- Arnar Ingi: Halla's friend
