= Skomer guillemot study =

Long-term ornithological study in Wales

The Skomer guillemot study is a long-term ornithological research project examining the population biology and behaviour of the common guillemot (Uria aalge) on Skomer island in Pembrokeshire, Wales. Initiated by British ornithologist and evolutionary biologist Tim Birkhead in 1972 during his doctoral research, the study has continued for more than five decades.

The island is owned by Natural Resources Wales and managed by the Wildlife Trust of South and West Wales (WTSWW) and is one of the United Kingdom's designated Key Sites within the Seabird Monitoring Programme.

The project records changes in population size, adult and immature survival, breeding success and the timing of reproduction. Its findings have been used to assess the effects of oil pollution, climate change, extreme weather and highly pathogenic avian influenza on a long-lived seabird population.

Alongside these biological findings, the project has developed and evaluated methods for studying and monitoring breeding guillemots in their densely occupied breeding colonies.

== Background ==
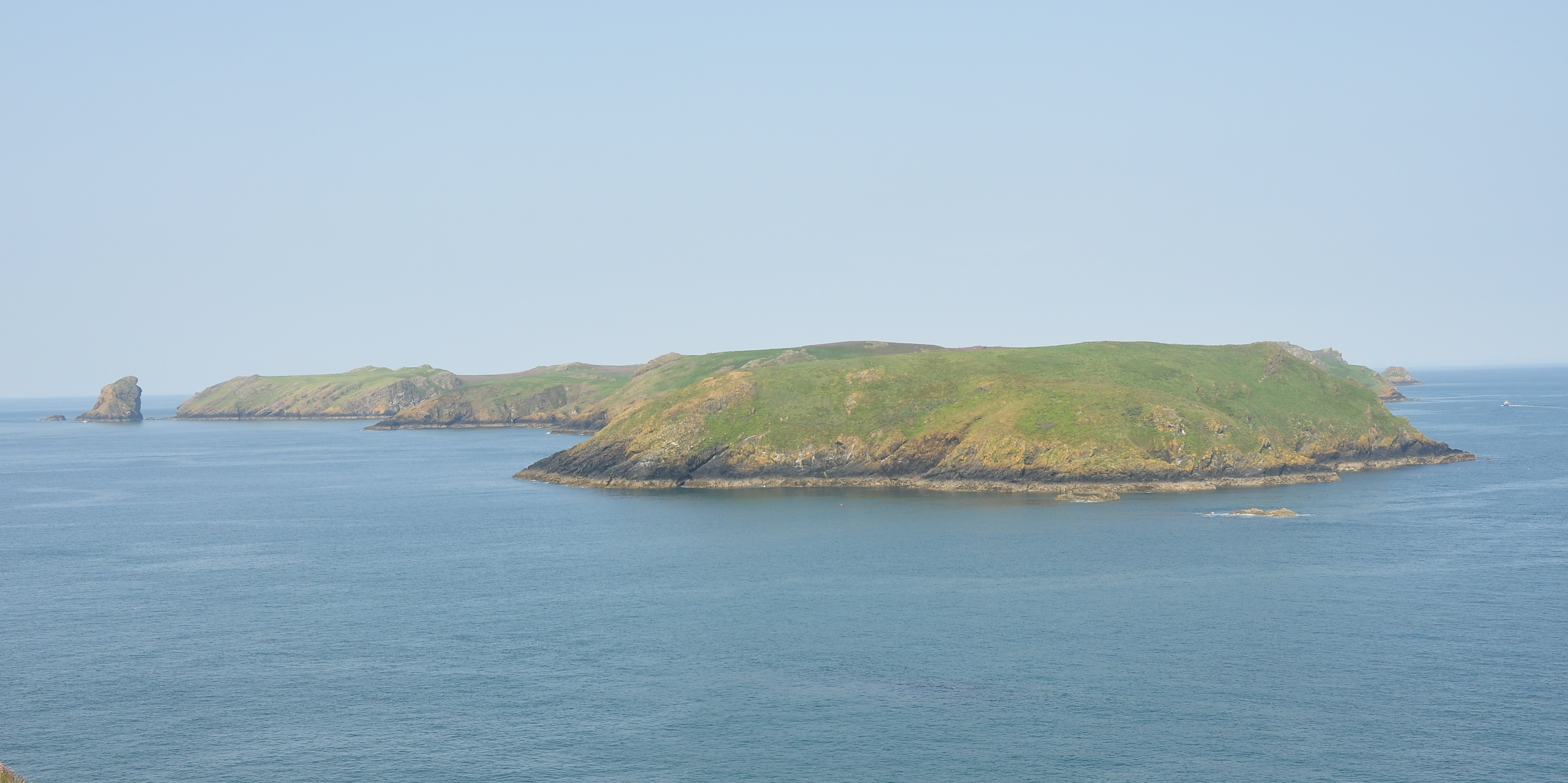
Skomer island, where the guillemot study has been conducted since 1972, viewed from Martin's Haven on the Pembrokeshire coast.

Skomer island is a National Nature Reserve off the coast of Pembrokeshire. The island was acquired by the Nature Conservancy in 1959, with assistance from the West Wales Field Society, and is now owned by Natural Resources Wales and managed by the Wildlife Trust of South and West Wales. It is internationally important for its breeding seabirds. Its avifauna includes the world's largest breeding colony of Manx shearwaters, together with substantial populations of Atlantic puffins, common guillemots, razorbills, black-legged kittiwakes, northern fulmars and several gull species. Other notable fauna include the endemic Skomer vole and breeding grey seals.

During the mid-twentieth century, auk populations declined in southern Britain. Marked declines were recorded at some southern English auk colonies during the period 1940–1969, while on Skomer the common guillemot population fell from an estimated 100,000 breeding pairs before the Second World War to approximately 2,000 pairs by 1972.

At the same time, national seabird monitoring was becoming more systematic. Operation Seafarer was a one-off census of coastal breeding colonies across Britain and Ireland organised by the recently formed Seabird Group, a British ornithological organisation, and coordinated by David Saunders. It involved more than 1,000 surveyors, most of them volunteers, who attempted to locate and, where possible, count nesting seabirds along the coastline. Most of the survey was carried out during the 1969 breeding season, with gaps in coverage followed up in 1970. The census produced the first comprehensive, detailed account of the abundance and distribution of seabirds breeding around the coasts of Britain and Ireland. It also highlighted the difficulty of obtaining reliable counts of several auk species, including common guillemots, razorbills and Atlantic puffins.

Oil pollution was a particular concern following the 1967 Torrey Canyon oil spill, in which approximately 119,000 tonnes of crude oil were lost. A contemporary study estimated that the disaster killed more than 30,000 seabirds; guillemots and razorbills constituted 97 per cent of a sample of 1,223 recovered carcasses.

Against this background, British ornithologist Tim Birkhead began the Skomer project in 1972 while undertaking doctoral research at the University of Oxford. Its principal aims were to investigate the population biology of Skomer's common guillemots and identify the causes of their decline, with chronic oil pollution considered an important contributing factor. His 1976 thesis, submitted for the degree of Doctor of Philosophy, examined population parameters, survival and aspects of the breeding biology of common guillemots on Skomer.

Birkhead continued returning to Skomer annually after completing his doctorate, developing the original doctoral project into a long-term monitoring programme.

== Methods ==
The study combines population counts with observations of individually identifiable birds. Adult and immature survival are estimated through the annual resighting of colour-ringed guillemots, and the timing of egg laying and reproductive success are recorded at monitored breeding sites.

=== Methodological contributions ===
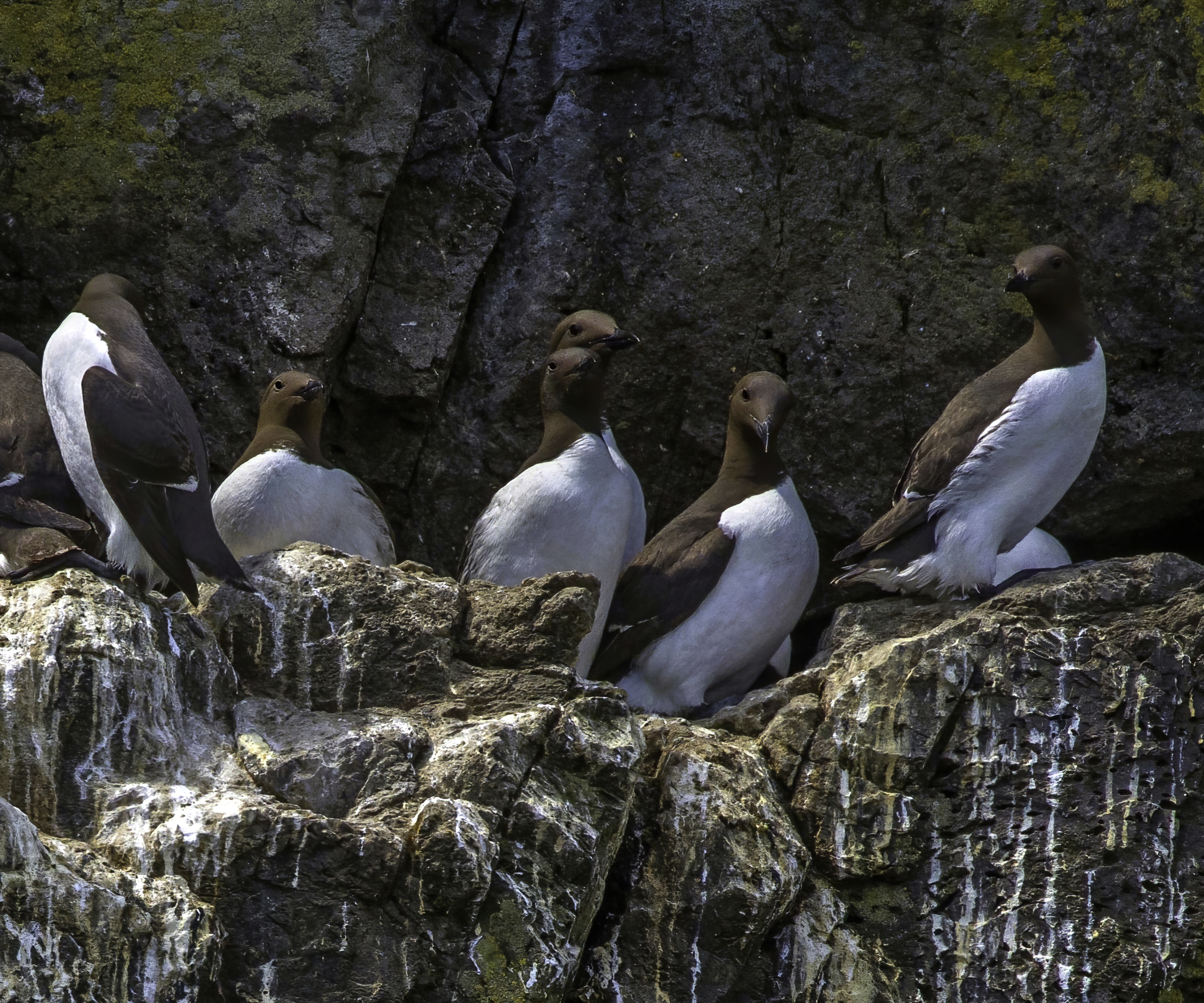
A breeding colony of common guillemots on Skomer. Their high nesting density and use of exposed cliff ledges complicate population censuses.

Alongside its biological findings, the Skomer study has made methodological contributions to the study and monitoring of breeding guillemots. The species is difficult to census because the birds occupy exposed cliff ledges at very high densities, some parts of the colony can be observed only from a boat, and the number of adults attending the colony varies during the breeding season. Whole-island counts are consequently labour-intensive, and the number of birds present on the ledges does not correspond directly to the number of breeding pairs.

In 1973, the project introduced a subsampling method based on repeated counts of fixed cliff-face plots during the period of the breeding season when colony attendance was least variable. Detailed observations were used to estimate the relationship between the number of birds counted and the number of breeding pairs. The continued collection of both plot counts and whole-island counts later allowed the two approaches to be compared.

An analysis of the long-term census data found that the advancement of breeding dates had affected the accuracy of population counts. Because censuses had traditionally been conducted during fixed calendar dates, they increasingly occurred too late in the breeding cycle and could underestimate the number of breeding birds. The researchers recommended scheduling censuses relative to each year's median egg-laying date rather than using the same dates annually.

== Scientific findings ==
From approximately 1980, Skomer's common guillemot population began to recover, increasing at an estimated rate of about five per cent annually. An analysis of more than thirty years of productivity and adult and juvenile survival data found that the observed increase in common guillemot numbers could be explained by the population's intrinsic demographic rates, without requiring immigration as an explanation. A 2015 review by the Joint Nature Conservation Committee subsequently used the Skomer analysis when compiling recommended demographic rates for UK common guillemot population models. By 2022, the island supported approximately 21,000 breeding pairs of common guillemots.

The long-term record has been used to investigate the effects of oil pollution and changing climatic conditions on the colony. The median egg-laying date on Skomer advanced by more than two weeks between 1972 and 2022, a change considered likely to be associated with climate change. In 2014, Al Jazeera reported that Birkhead's records showed progressively earlier breeding between the 1970s and 2010 and a threefold increase in deaths among ringed guillemots following severe winter storms.

Long-term demographic records have also been used to examine the effects of winter weather. A study combining several decades of records from individually marked guillemots on Skomer with tracking data on their movements and detailed weather records from the areas they used found that adult guillemot survival was lower in stormier winters and was also negatively associated with higher summer sea surface temperatures. The effects differed among the three auk species monitored on the island: razorbill survival also declined in stormier winters, whereas puffin survival was most strongly associated with winter sea surface temperature.

A key result from Birkhead's doctoral research was that breeding success was highest among densely grouped guillemots and lowest among sparsely grouped birds. Denser groups laid their eggs more synchronously and were better able to defend eggs and chicks against predatory gulls and ravens. The JNCC review later included Birkhead's study among the evidence that common guillemot productivity can decline at low nesting densities and identified collective defence as a frequent explanation for this pattern among colonial seabirds. This positive relationship between local nesting density and breeding success is an example of an Allee effect, because birds in sparse groups receive less collective protection against predators.

=== Social behaviour ===
Long-term observations at Skomer have also contributed to research on the social and reproductive behaviour of common guillemots. The birds breed at high density on exposed ledges, where collective defence helps protect their eggs and chicks from predatory gulls and ravens.

Observations at Skomer identified behavioural adaptations to this exceptionally dense nesting. Active and passive appeasement displays were more frequent at higher densities, site-ownership displays were common, and extra-pair mounting was recorded.

A molecular ecology study associated with the project detected extra-pair paternity in six of the 77 families examined, or 7.8 per cent, meaning that the chick had been fathered by a male other than the female's social partner.

Earlier experimental research had shown that common guillemots could distinguish their own eggs from those of neighbouring birds. The Skomer observations suggested that individual variation in egg colour and maculation could provide cues for such recognition.

=== Avian influenza ===
An outbreak of highly pathogenic avian influenza was confirmed in Pembrokeshire in July 2023 after hundreds of dead seabirds, most of them common guillemots, were found on nearby beaches. The Skomer monitoring programme recorded numerous deaths among common guillemots, including individually ringed birds belonging to the long-term study population.

Monitoring in 2024 found that sightings of ringed adults were 20–30 per cent lower than in previous years. Birkhead and Ben Hatchwell, a professor of evolutionary ecology at the University of Sheffield whose doctoral research examined the Skomer guillemot population and who has continued to collaborate on the project, estimated that the outbreak had caused the loss of approximately 20–30 per cent of the population, although they stated that its full effects would take several years to determine.

The researchers also observed compensatory recruitment in 2024, with younger birds beginning to breed much earlier than usual and occupying breeding sites left vacant following the outbreak. Because these recruits were relatively young, breeding success was lower than in several preceding years.

=== Research on egg shape ===
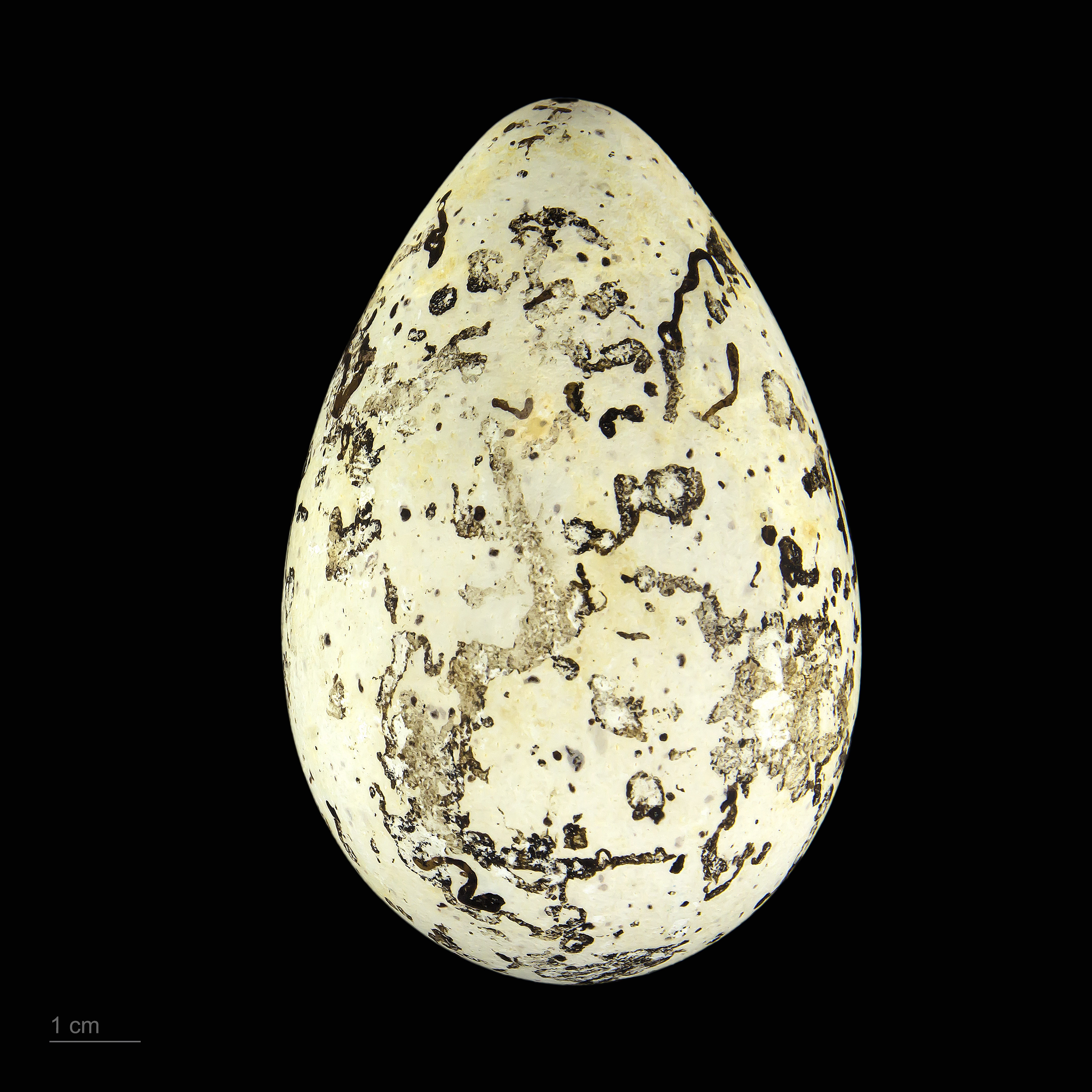
Egg of the common guillemot (Uria aalge), showing the pyriform shape investigated by Birkhead and collaborators.

Birkhead and collaborators examined the adaptive significance and measurement of the guillemot's strongly pyriform egg. Experimental work found that, rather than causing the egg to roll in a tight circle as had traditionally been proposed, the pyriform shape increased stability on sloping surfaces. The experiments also found that the shape reduced movement during incubation changeovers.

A method was developed for quantifying egg outlines from digital images, including highly pyriform guillemot eggs. It provided separate indices of elongation, pointedness and polar asymmetry and represented the full range of egg shapes more accurately than several alternatives. The method was later applied in a comparative analysis of 5,378 eggs from 955 bird species. That study concluded that egg elongation was influenced mainly by anatomical constraints during formation, whereas asymmetry was associated principally with conditions during incubation.

== Significance of long-term monitoring ==
Long-term ecological studies can reveal population trends and ecological processes that may be obscured by short-term variability, including delayed responses to environmental change and the effects of infrequent or extreme events. Such datasets can also support ecological modelling, conservation management and environmental policy. An analysis published in 2017 found that long-term studies were disproportionately represented in higher-impact ecological journals and in scientific reports intended to inform environmental policy.

Long-term individual-based studies are particularly valuable because they can connect successive life-history stages and generations, quantify age and social structure, and estimate lifetime reproductive success.

Over more than five decades, continuous monitoring on Skomer has enabled Birkhead and colleagues to estimate adult and immature survival and reproductive success, investigate the demographic basis of the colony's population recovery, quantify the effects of oil pollution and changes in breeding phenology, and evaluate the reliability of methods used to census breeding guillemots.

The Skomer programme has also contributed to large-scale comparative research on seabird responses to climate change. In 2025, data from Skomer were included in a study comparing 138 long-term records that tracked breeding success among 39 seabird species at 48 study sites in seven marine ecosystems across the Northern Hemisphere. The researchers examined whether ocean warming and changes in the layering of surface and deeper waters were associated with changes in seabird breeding success. They found that these relationships varied between ecosystems.

Birkhead has argued that population monitoring requires more than repeating a count each year in order to be scientifically useful. In the Skomer study, this has involved using clearly documented methods that can be applied consistently by successive observers, carefully training and supervising field assistants, and recording demographic measures such as breeding success and annual survival in addition to the number of birds present.

The project has also shown why monitoring methods must be reassessed when biological conditions change. As the guillemots' breeding season advanced, censuses conducted on the same fixed dates in June increasingly took place too late and underestimated the breeding population. Birkhead and Robert Montgomerie therefore recommended scheduling counts in relation to each year's median egg-laying date. This emphasis on repeatable methods accords with guidance in the Seabird Monitoring Handbook for Britain and Ireland, which provides standardised, species-specific procedures intended to make results comparable between colonies and years.

== Funding and continuation ==
For twenty years, ending in 2013, the project received annual funding from the Countryside Council for Wales. On 1 April 2013, the council's functions were transferred to the newly established Natural Resources Wales (NRW), and the study's annual funding of approximately £12,000 was not continued following the reorganisation.

NRW attributed the decision to restrictions on public spending and the need to prioritise the projects it supported. It stated that it has continued to fund less detailed monitoring of seabirds on Skomer. Birkhead argued that this monitoring did not collect data of sufficient quality on survival and population dynamics and was therefore not an adequate replacement for the long-term study.

In 2014, with support from the University of Sheffield, Birkhead launched a crowdfunding appeal seeking £12,000 to continue the study for another year. The target was reached within two weeks.

The project has subsequently continued through public donations and philanthropic support and is seeking longer-term funding to enable the monitoring programme to continue beyond Birkhead's retirement.

== Media coverage ==
In 2004, The Independent described the Skomer project as the longest and most detailed survey of a guillemot colony and noted that it had followed the life histories of approximately 8,000 individually colour-ringed birds.

In 2014, The Observer reported that the study had provided information about both guillemot population dynamics and changes in the surrounding marine environment.

In 2023, Patrick Barkham of The Guardian characterised the project as Birkhead's life's work and wrote that its long series of observations offered detailed insight into seabird ecology and behaviour during a period of rapid environmental change.

Birkhead was the subject of Edo Dzafic's 2025 short documentary The Birdman of Skomer, about his long-term study of seabirds on the island and the future of the research programme in the context of the loss of public funding for the study and the subsequent crowdfunding campaign. The 16-minute film was selected for the 2026 Wild & Scenic Film Festival and the International Wildlife Film Festival.
