= Tim Birkhead =

British ornithologist

Tim Birkhead FRS
- Born: Timothy Robert Birkhead; 28 February 1950 (age 76); Leeds, England
- Education: Newcastle University (BSc); University of Oxford (DPhil)
- Awards: Godman-Salvin Medal (2016); National Teaching Fellowship (2017)
- Scientific career
- Institutions: University of Sheffield
- Thesis: Breeding biology and survival of guillemots (Uria aalge) (1976)
- Doctoral advisor: E.K. Dunn; Chris Perrins
- Website: www.shef.ac.uk/aps/staff-and-students/acadstaff/birkhead

Timothy Robert Birkhead FRS (born 28 February 1950) is a British ornithologist, evolutionary biologist and author. Birkhead joined the University of Sheffield in 1976, where he successively held posts as lecturer, senior lecturer and reader in zoology. He was Professor of behavioural ecology from 1992 until 2019, when he became emeritus professor of behavioural ecology.

== Education ==
Birkhead was awarded a Bachelor's degree in Biology from Newcastle University in 1972, followed by a Doctor of Philosophy degree from University of Oxford in 1976 for research on the breeding biology and survival of guillemots Uria aalge supervised by E.K. Dunn and Chris Perrins. He was subsequently awarded a Doctor of Science from Newcastle in 1989.

== Research and career ==
Birkhead's research has focused on promiscuity and sperm competition in birds. With Anders Pape Møller, he co-authored Sperm Competition in Birds: Evolutionary Causes and Consequences in 1992.

His empirical research included studies showing that female feral fowl can eject sperm from subdominant males, that male fowl adjust sperm allocation according to female promiscuity, novelty and ornamentation, and that sperm traits in zebra finches are heritable.

Birkhead's research also resolved the issue of polyspermy in birds and provided the first evidence for morphological sperm selection in the female reproductive tract.

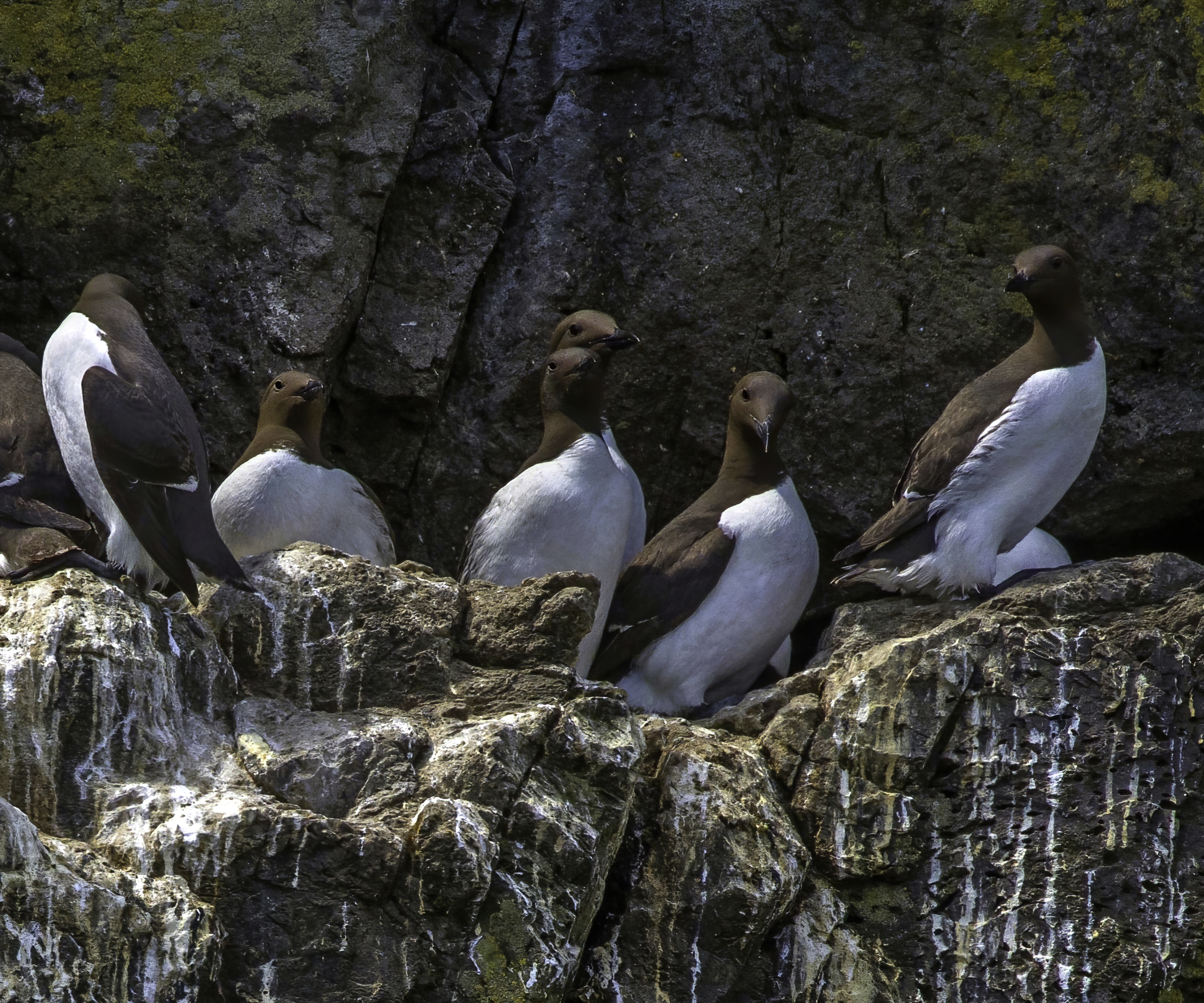
Common guillemots breeding on Skomer. Birkhead initiated the island's long-term guillemot study in 1972.

A major strand of Birkhead's research career has been the Skomer guillemot study, which he initiated in 1972 while undertaking doctoral research at the University of Oxford. The study began with the aim of understanding the population biology of Skomer's common guillemots and the causes of a severe decline in their numbers observed in the British Isles at the time. Birkhead continued returning to Skomer after completing his doctorate, developing the project into a long-term programme based on population counts, annual resightings of individually marked birds and records of breeding success. Over more than five decades, the study has documented the population's recovery and investigated the effects of oil pollution and climate change on guillemot survival and reproduction. This long-term ecological research lost its annual funding from the Countryside Council for Wales following the reorganisation of that body in 2013 and is since in need of financial support.

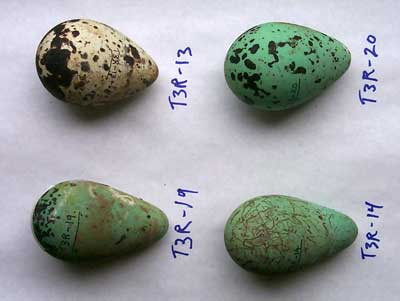
Common Guillemot (Uria aalge) eggs, illustrating the characteristically pyriform shape investigated by Birkhead and colleagues.

Birkhead has also investigated the adaptive significance of avian egg shape, particularly the common guillemot's strongly pyriform egg. Earlier explanations proposed that the shape caused the egg either to spin like a top or to roll in an arc, thereby reducing the risk of it rolling from a cliff ledge. Birkhead and colleagues found no evidence for either explanation. Their experiments instead showed that the pyriform shape increases the egg's stability on non-horizontal surfaces: this particular shape makes an egg inherently more stable on the sloping surfaces on which guillemots commonly breed.

=== Teaching ===
Birkhead has combined his enthusiasm for research with a passion for undergraduate teaching. He has taught courses on ecology, evolution, statistics, birds, behavioural ecology, animal behaviour and the history and philosophy of science. His teaching has been recognised by four awards, including a National Teaching Fellowship in 2017.

=== Biology of Spermatozoa ===
Starting in 1992 and continuing until 2015 (when he handed over to a steering group) Birkhead organised (with Professor Harry Moore) a small (~60) biennial meeting on reproductive biology in the Peak District National Park known as Biology of Spermatozoa (BoS). Delegates are from a diverse range of backgrounds and include clinicians, reproductive physiologists, andrologists, theoreticians and evolutionary biologists. The format and interdisciplinary nature of the meeting was successful in terms of exchanging ideas, techniques and establishing collaborations.

=== Professional service and visiting appointments ===
Birkhead served as president of the International Society for Behavioral Ecology from 1996 to 1998 and as president of the Association for the Study of Animal Behaviour from 2013 to 2015. He has also served as a vice-president of the British Trust for Ornithology.

In 2003, Birkhead was a Brockington Visitor at Queen's University in Canada, where he delivered a public lecture entitled “Darwin, Birds & Sexual Selection”.

== Publications ==
=== Selected books ===
- Perrins, Christopher M.; Birkhead, Tim R. (1983). Avian Ecology. Blackie. ISBN 978-0-216-91478-0.
- Nettleship, David N.; Birkhead, Tim R., eds. (1985). The Atlantic Alcidae: The Evolution, Distribution and Biology of the Auks Inhabiting the Atlantic Ocean and Adjacent Water Areas. London: Academic Press. ISBN 978-0-12-515670-7.
- Brooke, Michael; Birkhead, Tim R., eds. (1991). The Cambridge Encyclopedia of Ornithology. Cambridge University Press. ISBN 978-0-521-36205-4.
- Birkhead, Tim R. (2010) [1991]. The Magpies: The Ecology and Behaviour of Black-Billed and Yellow-Billed Magpies. T & AD Poyser. ISBN 978-1-4081-3776-5.
- Birkhead, Tim R.; Møller, Anders Pape (1992). Sperm Competition in Birds: Evolutionary Causes and Consequences. Academic Press. ISBN 978-0-12-100540-5.
- Birkhead, Tim R. (2010) [1993]. Great Auk Islands: A Field Biologist in the Arctic. T & AD Poyser. ISBN 978-1-4081-3786-4.
- Birkhead, Tim R.; Møller, Anders Pape, eds. (1998). Sperm Competition and Sexual Selection. Academic Press. doi:10.1016/B978-0-12-100543-6.X5022-3. ISBN 978-0-12-100543-6.
- Birkhead, Tim (2000). Promiscuity: An Evolutionary History of Sperm Competition and Sexual Conflict. Faber and Faber. ISBN 978-0-571-19360-8.
- Birkhead, Tim (2003). The Red Canary: The Story of the First Genetically Engineered Animal. Weidenfeld & Nicolson. ISBN 978-0-297-82996-6.
- Birkhead, Tim (2011) [2008]. The Wisdom of Birds: An Illustrated History of Ornithology. Bloomsbury. ISBN 978-0-7475-9822-0.
- Birkhead, Tim R.; Hosken, David J.; Pitnick, Scott, eds. (2009). Sperm Biology: An Evolutionary Perspective. Academic Press. ISBN 978-0-12-372568-4.
- Birkhead, Tim (2012). Bird Sense: What It's Like to Be a Bird. Bloomsbury. ISBN 978-1-4088-2013-1.
- Birkhead, Tim; Wimpenny, Jo; Montgomerie, Robert (2014). Ten Thousand Birds: Ornithology since Darwin. Princeton University Press. ISBN 978-0-691-15197-7.
- Birkhead, Tim, ed. (2016). Virtuoso by Nature: The Scientific Worlds of Francis Willughby FRS (1635–1672). Brill. ISBN 978-90-04-28531-6.
- Birkhead, Tim (2016). The Most Perfect Thing: Inside (and Outside) a Bird's Egg. Bloomsbury. ISBN 978-1-4088-5125-8.
- Birkhead, Tim (2018). The Wonderful Mr Willughby: The First True Ornithologist. Bloomsbury. ISBN 978-1-4088-7848-4.
- Birkhead, Tim (2022). Birds and Us: A 12,000-Year History from Cave Art to Conservation. Princeton University Press. doi:10.1515/9780691239941. ISBN 978-0-691-23992-7.
- Birkhead, Tim (2025). The Great Auk: Its Extraordinary Life, Hideous Death and Mysterious Afterlife. Bloomsbury. ISBN 978-1-3994-1574-3.

== Media and outreach ==
Between 2002 and 2010 Birkhead had a monthly column in Times Higher Education. His articles were concerned with various aspects of higher education: undergraduate teaching, administration and, occasionally, research.

He has written for The Independent and The Biologist.

He has appeared on BBC radio programmes including BBC Radio 4's The Life Scientific with Jim Al-Khalili, The Infinite Monkey Cage, and BBC Radio 3's Private Passions.

In 2012, The Guardian published a short video profile entitled The Birdman of Skomer: "Guillemots are basically people", in which Birkhead discussed his then 40-year study of common guillemots on Skomer.

Birkhead was later the subject of Edo Dzafic's 2025 short documentary The Birdman of Skomer, about his long-term study of seabirds on the island and the future of the research programme. The 16-minute film was selected for the 2026 Wild & Scenic Film Festival and the International Wildlife Film Festival.

His book The Most Perfect Thing formed the basis of the 2018 BBC documentary Attenborough's Wonder of Eggs, presented by David Attenborough.

Birkhead's research on historical common guillemot egg collecting, including a 2018 paper co-authored with Robert Montgomerie, inspired Belinda Bauer's 2025 crime novel The Impossible Thing.

Birkhead was honorary curator of the Alfred Denny Museum at the University of Sheffield until 2018.

He has given numerous public lectures, including at Café Scientique, the Cheltenham Science Festival and numerous literary festivals including Ways with Words (Sheffield) and Hay on Wye. His TED (conference) lecture on the history of ornithology has been viewed over 100,000 times.

== Awards and honours ==
Birkhead was elected a Fellow of the Royal Society in 2004. His research honours include the Elliott Coues Award of the American Ornithologists' Union in 2011, the Association for the Study of Animal Behaviour Medal in 2012, the Godman-Salvin Medal of the British Ornithologists' Union in 2016, and the Founders' Medal of the Society for the History of Natural History in the same year.

He was elected an honorary fellow of the American Ornithologists' Union in 2010 and an honorary member of the Linnaean Society of New York in 2011. In 2017, he was elected an honorary member of the German Ornithologists' Society.

His books have also received awards. The Cambridge Encyclopedia of Ornithology received the McColvin Medal for best reference book in 1991, The Red Canary received the Consul Cremer Prize in 2003, and The Wisdom of Birds received the Best Bird Book of the Year Award from the British Trust for Ornithology and British Birds in 2009.

Bird Sense received the BB/BTO Best Bird Book of the Year Award for 2012 and was shortlisted for the 2013 Royal Society Winton Prize for Science Books.

Ten Thousand Birds: Ornithology since Darwin received an honourable mention in the “History of STM” category of the 2015 PROSE Awards.

The Most Perfect Thing was shortlisted for the 2016 Royal Society Insight Investment Science Book Prize.

Birkhead's teaching honours include the University of Sheffield's Senate Award for Sustained Excellence in Teaching in 2007, its Animal and Plant Sciences Teacher of the Year Award in 2009, and the UK Higher Education Bioscience Teacher of the Year Award in 2013. He received a National Teaching Fellowship in 2017.

For science communication, Birkhead received the Zoological Society of London Silver Medal in 2013 for contributions to the understanding and appreciation of bird ecology and sexual selection, science writing and public engagement. He received the 2015 Eisenmann Medal of the Linnaean Society of New York, presented at the society's annual dinner in 2016, for excellence in ornithology and encouragement of amateur ornithologists.

In 2016, Birkhead received the ZSL/Clarivate Award for Communicating Zoology for The Most Perfect Thing. He received the Stephen Jay Gould Prize from the Society for the Study of Evolution in 2017 for his contribution to public understanding of evolutionary science.

== See also ==
- Skomer guillemot study
