= Metland Egg =

Series of bird's eggs from the UK

- Another reddish brown guillemot's egg from the collection of the Natural History Museum, London. No image of the Metland Egg is known to exist.
- Type: Guillemot egg
- Housed at: Unknown
- Established: 1912–1938

The Metland Egg (Note: The Metland Egg is referred to by egg collectors in the singular although it is a set of similar-coloured eggs collected from one location.) is a series of eggs collected from a single female common guillemot on the Bempton Cliffs in Yorkshire in the period 1912 to 1938. The eggs were predominantly red in colour, and were considered highly desirable by egg collectors. More than 28 specimens of the Metland Egg were in the possession of a Lancashire collector, Frederick George Lupton, who sold his collection to Vivian Hewitt, in the 1940s. The whereabouts of the eggs after Hewitt's death is unknown. The Metland Egg was the subject of a crime novel published in 2025.

== Background ==
Before the collection of wild bird eggs became illegal, guillemot eggs were highly desirable to egg collectors as they are large, are unusually shaped, and come in a huge variety of markings and colours. A female guillemot will lay eggs with the same colour and markings in the same spot each year. If eggs are removed early in the season, a female guillemot may lay a second or even third egg in the same year. Birkhead estimates the frequency of red eggs in guillemots as less than one in a thousand or one in ten thousand.

In 1883, Henry Seebohm described the practice of "climming" (climbing), lowering men on ropes down the Bempton Cliffs to collect seabird eggs for food. In an interview with a veteran climmer, he relates "he used to get a very rare and highly-prized variety, of an almost uniform rich reddish-brown colour, on a certain ledge twice every year, which continued for fifteen years in succession, after which the poor bird died, or was shot or became a 'shunted dowager.'" Seebohm included a marbled red egg among his 1896 illustrations for guillemot eggs.

Twenty years after Seebohm's description of climming, E. W. Wade further detailed the practice, including photographs of climmers at work at Bempton Cliffs. Wade estimated that 130,000 guillemot eggs were collected over a season of about six weeks each year.

The colours of the Guillemot’s egg vary more than in those of any other bird. The general type is a greeny blue with streaks and splotches of black. Next in point of numbers is a white egg with black streaks and blotches. The rest have no definite scheme of colouration, but show every shade of red from the lightest ‘‘rusty” to deepest chocolate-red, whilst brown, fawn, buff, stone colour, blue; green, yellow, and violet, combine in endless shades and varieties of marking, spots, blotches, and scrawls, to make a bewildering display, the richness of which almost dazzles the beholder. The varieties of size and shape are also extraordinary. No cliffs are so famous for producing these varieties as our own.

— E. W. Wade, The Birds of Bempton Cliffs, Page 13

== Origin ==
In the preface to his 2016 popular science book The Most Perfect Thing, Tim Birkhead relates the story of Frederick George Lupton (known as George, 1881–1970), a Lancashire lawyer and avid egg collector, who bought a series of rare red guillemot eggs, that became collectively known as the Metland Egg. Named for a nearby farm, the egg was collected from the same spot at Bempton from 1912 until 1938. Lupton owned at least 28 of the eggs. The diary of another egg collector, George Rickaby, records that no Metland Egg was found in 1939. The Metland Egg series likely represents the entire reproductive output of one female, according to Birkhead.

An earlier red egg, named the Bempton Belle, was also collected at Bempton, from 1891 until 1906, and was in the collection of a Jeremiah Goodall (1862–1939). That egg, originally described as "deep blood red" or "port wine" colour, but now faded to brown due to light exposure, is in the collection of the Delaware Museum of Natural History, along with a poem describing its origins and original colour as red. Birkhead considers that it is just possible, but unlikely, that the Bempton Belle and the Metland Egg could have been laid by the same bird, and that it is more likely, if egg colour variation is inherited, that the birds were related.

== Location ==
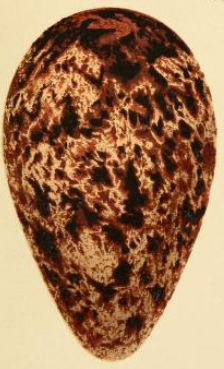
An illustration of a reddish brown guillemot's egg from Henry Seebohm's 1896 work Coloured Figures of the Eggs of British Birds.

The whereabouts of any of the Metland Eggs is unknown. Lupton collected over 1000 unusual guillemot eggs, among other items, and had what George Rickaby considered the world's best collection. For financial reasons, he sold the collection in the 1940s to an eccentric millionaire Welshman, Vivian Hewitt. Hewitt began by collecting eggs himself, before becoming a purchaser of other people's collections. Hewitt lived a reclusive life on Anglesey, where he set up a bird sanctuary. He also collected great auk skins and eggs, which were housed in the Bahamas.

Hewitt died in 1965, and left his collection to his housekeeper's son, who donated it to the British Trust for Ornithology (BTO) at Tring. The BTO did not have enough space for the entire collection and asked the Natural History Museum (NHM), which also has storage at Tring, to store some of it. Parts of the collection were taken by the NHM and other museums, and an American collector Johnnie du Pont, bought the remainder for the Delaware Museum of Natural History. Before the collection was shipped to America, the Jourdain Society identified parts that had been collected by Francis Jourdain, and those were retained by the NHM. Birkhead relates that the collections at Tring and the Delaware Museum of Natural History are disorganised and either lacking data slips, or lacking matches between eggs and data slips.

It has been illegal to take, own or sell wild bird eggs in the UK since the passing of the Protection of Birds Act 1954 and the Wildlife and Countryside Act 1981. Whilst eggs that predate the legislation would be exempt, the burden of proof rests on the owner of an egg to prove its age and provenance.

== In popular fiction ==
The Metland Egg was the focus of a 2025 crime novel by Belinda Bauer, titled The Impossible Thing. Bauer acknowledged in the second edition that the idea for the novel was sparked by a radio interview given by Tim Birkhead, talking about his 2016 popular science book The Most Perfect Thing: Inside (and Outside) a Bird's Egg.
