= The Great Auk =

2025 natural history book by Tim Birkhead

- First-edition cover
- Author: Tim Birkhead
- Cover artist: Bruce Pearson
- Language: English
- Subject: Great auk
- Publisher: Bloomsbury Sigma
- Publication date: 13 March 2025
- Publication place: United Kingdom
- Media type: Print, e-book and audiobook
- Pages: 288
- ISBN: 978-1-3994-1574-3

The Great Auk: Its Extraordinary Life, Hideous Death and Mysterious Afterlife is a 2025 natural history book by British ornithologist and evolutionary biologist Tim Birkhead. Published by Bloomsbury Sigma, it examines the biology of the extinct great auk, the human exploitation that caused its extinction, and the subsequent history of its surviving skins, eggs and other remains.

== Background and publication ==
Birkhead began studying common guillemots on Skomer Island as a doctoral student in 1973. His 1976 DPhil thesis examined their breeding biology and survival, and the research subsequently developed into a fifty-year study of the island's guillemot population.

Before writing the book, Birkhead had also published research on the likely development of great auk chicks and on the species' incubation biology.

According to Oliver Southall in The Spectator, Birkhead's unexpected encounter with one of the great auk eggs formerly owned by aviator and egg collector Vivian Hewitt helped provide the impetus for the book. Hewitt had assembled thirteen great auk eggs and four mounted skins, and the later fate of his collection became one of the book's principal subjects.

The book was first published in the United Kingdom by Bloomsbury Sigma on 13 March 2025. A paperback edition was published on 18 June 2026.

== Contents ==
The book is divided into two principal parts, entitled "Life" and "Afterlife". The first reconstructs the great auk's ecology, breeding behaviour and development, drawing comparisons with living members of the auk family such as guillemots and razorbills. It then traces human exploitation of the species, from prehistoric hunting to commercial slaughter at breeding colonies such as Funk Island, and the killing of the last known breeding pair on Eldey in Iceland.

The second part examines the history of the surviving eggs, skins, skeletons and preserved organs after the species became extinct. Much of this section concerns Hewitt's collection and the later sale, dispersal and disappearance of some of its specimens. The final chapters consider what museum remains and genetic research can reveal about the species, as well as reported sightings after 1844, the prospects and limitations of de-extinction, and the wider conservation lessons of the great auk's disappearance.

== Reception ==
The book received generally favourable reviews. The Daily Telegraph described it as "mesmerising" and praised Birkhead as both an enthusiast and an authority on his subject.

Writing in The Spectator, Southall called the book "lively and meticulous". He highlighted its account of the commercial destruction of the species, the scientific pursuit of its final specimens and the later fascination exerted by its surviving remains.

Jon Carter of the British Trust for Ornithology praised Birkhead's writing as accessible and informative. Carter particularly noted the book's combination of the species' biology and extinction with the sometimes unusual history of its eggs, skins and other remains.

Writing for the BirdGuides website, Josh Jones praised the book's clarity and readability, concluding: "Quite simply, it is one of the best natural history books I have read in some time."

Publishers Weekly called the book a "fascinating study", praising Birkhead's reconstruction of the species' probable behaviour and his discussion of what genetic analysis of preserved remains has revealed. The review described the book's account of human responsibility for the extinction as a warning about humanity's obligations towards the natural world.

The book also received an academic review in the ornithological journal Waterbirds.
