= Bempton Cliffs =

RSPB nature reserve in the East Riding of Yorkshire, England

- Cliff
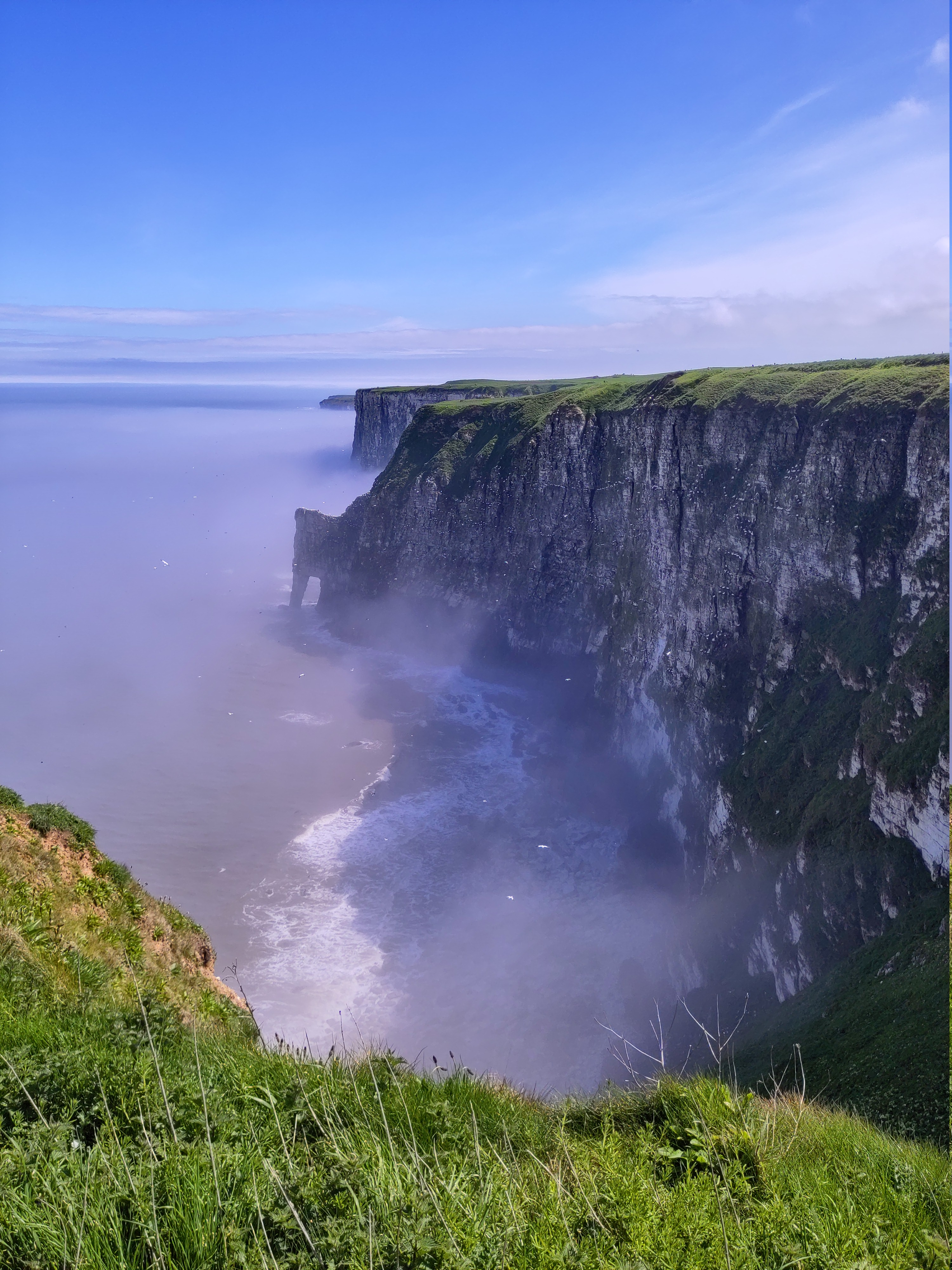
- Staple Newk stack at Bempton Cliffs, UK, viewed from the New Roll Up viewing platform.

- Location within East Riding of Yorkshire
- Coordinates: 54.146111°N 0.160278°W
- Grid position: TA 201 738
- Location: East Riding of Yorkshire, England

Bempton Cliffs is a section of precipitous coast at Bempton in the East Riding of Yorkshire, England. It is run by the Royal Society for the Protection of Birds (RSPB) as a nature reserve and is known for its breeding seabirds, including northern gannet, Atlantic puffin, razorbill, common guillemot, black-legged kittiwake and fulmar. There is a visitor centre.

== Location ==
The hard chalk cliffs at Bempton rise are relatively resistant to erosion and offer many sheltered headlands and crevices for nesting birds. The cliffs run about 6 miles (10 km) from Flamborough Head north towards Filey and are over 330 feet (100 m) high at points.

The cliffs at Bempton are some of the highest chalk cliffs in England, Beachy Head in East Sussex being the highest at 530 feet (160 m). The area administered by the RSPB also includes Buckton Cliffs.

There are good walkways along the top of the cliffs, and several well-fenced and protected observation points.

== Bird species ==
=== Gannets ===
Bempton Cliffs is home to the only mainland breeding colony of gannets in England. The birds arrive at the colony from January and leave in August and September.

=== Kittiwakes ===
Numerically the most common bird, around 10% of the United Kingdom population of kittiwakes (Rissa tridactyla) nest here.

=== Puffins ===
The Atlantic puffins (Fratercula arctica) at Bempton Cliffs tend to nest in rock crevices, whereas burrows are used at most UK sites. Although there are estimated to be around 958 birds (450 breeding pairs), it is relatively difficult to get a close view of them. The puffins along the Yorkshire coast are now endangered.

The Bempton puffins mostly fly 25 miles (40 km) east to the Dogger Bank to feed. Their numbers may, however, be adversely affected by a reduction in local sand eel numbers caused by global warming, in turn caused by plankton being driven north by the 2 degree rise in local sea temperatures.

=== Tree sparrows ===
The RSPB reports that tree sparrows are very common, nesting in boxes at the visitor centre. Over 400 tree sparrows fledged in 2023, and over 150 in 2025.

== Artwork ==
A series of 22 panels of phonetic birdsong by artist Adrian Riley were commissioned by the RSPB in 2017 and are installed across the site near habitats appropriate to the birdsong in each panel.

== In fiction ==
The cliffs play an important role in Belinda Bauer's 2025 novel The Impossible Thing, which focuses on the search for a rare red guillemot egg, known as the Metland Egg, robbed from the cliffs.
