= Vivian Hewitt =

Welsh aviator (1888–1965)

- Born: 1888; Grimsby, Lincolnshire, England
- Died: 1965 (aged 76–77)
- Known for: Second flight from Great Britain to Ireland, 26 April 1912
- Aviation career
- Flight license: 1 October 1912; London

Vivian Vaughan Davies Hewitt (1888–1965) was a pioneering Welsh aviator. Born in Grimsby, he moved to Bodfari, Denbighshire, Wales, his mother's family home, on the death of his father during his childhood.

On 26 April 1912, Hewitt successfully completed a flight between Holyhead and Dublin, landing in the Phoenix Park. Interviewed by the press, he expressed the view that Damer Leslie Allen, who had disappeared a few days earlier whilst attempting the same flight, had been insufficiently experienced as an aviator for a task of such difficulty.

Although widely reported to be the first person to cross the sea from Great Britain to Ireland in an aeroplane, several days earlier, on 22 April Denys Corbett Wilson had flown from Goodwick in Pembrokeshire to Enniscorthy. Nevertheless, the view was expressed at the time that Hewitt's flight was "a more difficult and dangerous feat" than Corbett Wilson's.

Hewitt was also a keen ornithologist and set up a bird sanctuary at his home of Bryn Aber at Cemlyn Bay, Anglesey, which is now managed by The North Wales Wildlife Trust. He was known as the "world’s greatest private Great Auk collector", as he built up a collection of the skins and eggs of these extinct birds. Hewitt was also believed to have owned some or all of the Metland Egg, when he bought F. G. Lupton's egg collection in the early 1940s, although the location of the eggs is unknown after that. Hewitt's specimens are now in museums in Cardiff, Birmingham, Los Angeles, and Cincinnati.
