= Zoelucasa =

Scientific classification
- Domain: Eukaryota
- Clade: Sar
- Clade: Rhizaria
- Phylum: Cercozoa
- Subphylum: Filosa
- Class: Imbricatea
- Superorder: Euglyphia
- Order: Zoelucasida; Cavalier-Smith in Scoble & Cavalier-Smith 2014
- Family: Zoelucasidae; Cavalier-Smith in Scoble & Cavalier-Smith 2014
- Genus: Zoelucasa; Nicholls 2012
- Species: Z. sablensis

Binomial name
- Zoelucasa sablensis Nicholls 2012

Genus of imbricate cercozoans

Zoelucasa is a genus of imbricate cercozoans. It is the only genus in the family Zoelucasidae and order Zoelucasida and belongs to the superorder Euglyphia. It contains the sole species Zoelucasa sablensis.

== Characteristics ==
The posterior cilia are curved backward; the cells have non-sliding double cilia. Parallel centrioles are present. A large nucleus and a rigid lorica composed of large imbricate, overlapping, likely silicified oval scales that are probably double-layered, with meshwork connecting the smooth unperforated layers. The cells are housed within this lorica, which consists of a single morphological form of silicified scales. There are no chloroplasts. There is a long, single posterior flagellum and a short, single anterior flagellum extending laterally. The cells have a diameter of approximately 10 micrometers. They are found within a radially symmetrical, pyriform lorica that is 1.5–2 times the cell diameter in length (smaller in dried specimens). This lorica consists of 10–15 large, overlapping, circular to slightly elliptical scales, each with a diameter of 3–6 micrometers. The scales lack ornamentation, and their distal surfaces are convex. The long, posterior, trailing flagellum is approximately 1–1.5 times the length of the lorica. The shorter anterior flagellum is generally shorter than the cell diameter. Both flagella emerge from an anterior flagellar pocket in a parallel arrangement.

== Taxonomy ==
Zoelucasa was first described in 2012 by Nicholls with the only species Zoelucasa sablensis. The genus was assigned phylum Cercozoa incertae sedis, and noted to most likely belong to class Imbricatea. Later, Cavalier-Smith described the monotypic order Zoelucasida and monotypic family Zoelucasidae in Scoble and Cavalier-Smith, 2014. It was assigned to the imbricate superorder Placofila, along with Thaumatomonadida. In 2018, the imbricate superorder Euglyphia was described by Cavalier-Smith in Cavalier-Smith et al., 2018 and Zoelucasida was assigned to there along with the order Euglyphida. In 2020, a new order Trivalvulariida was described by Siemensma and Dumack and also assigned to Euglyphia.
