= The Wonderful Mr Willughby =

2018 biography of Francis Willughby by Tim Birkhead

The Wonderful Mr Willughby: The First True Ornithologist
- First edition
- Author: Tim Birkhead
- Language: English
- Subject: Francis Willughby
- Publisher: Bloomsbury Publishing
- Publication date: 2018
- Publication place: UK
- Media type: Print
- Pages: xii+353 (first edition; hbk); 50 colour images, 32 black-and-white illustrations, 3 tables, 3 chartes, 5 maps
- ISBN: 978-1-4088-7848-4
- OCLC: 1001924209

The Wonderful Mr Willughby: The First True Ornithologist is a 2018 biography, written by Tim Birkhead, about Francis Willughby (1635–1672), an English ornithologist, ichthyologist, entomologist, and Fellow of the Royal Society. Birkhead's work is the first book-length biography of Willughby.

== Birkhead's scholarship and motivation ==
In the decade preceding the year 2018, Tim Birkhead, a university professor and professional ornithologist, produced considerable scholarly work concerning the 17th century naturalists Francis Ray and John Ray. For 3 academic years from 2012 to 2015, Birkhead had a Leverhulme International Network grant to work with a group of science historians to produce the book Virtuoso by nature: The scientific worlds of Francis Willughby FRS (1635–1672), published in 2016 by Brill. The group of scholars included Anna Marie Roos. In the preface to The Wonderful Mr Willughy, Birkhead mentions how Charles E. Raven's 1942 biography of John Ray distorted a correct historical evaluation of the achievements of Ray's collaborator Francis Willughby and how Birkhead became motivated to write a book-length biography of Willughby.

In writing The Wonderful Mr Willughby, Birkhead used the Middleton Collection now stored at the University of Nottingham Library, a portion of Willoughby's cabinet of curiosities, and the commonplace book used by Willughby when he studied at the University of Cambridge. In preparing the biography, Birkhead made good use of overlooked manuscripts and relics related to Willughby's research and clarified information about the European ornithological investigations jointly done by Willughby and Ray.

== Contents ==
This biography, with 10 chapters and 4 appendices, tells the story of Francis Willughby's life and research. He was born the only son in a family of landed gentry and became a student at Trinity College, Cambridge. There he was tutored by John Ray, who became a lifetime friend and colleague. In taxonomy, Ray and Willughby introduced a system of precise anatomical description that distinguished between species, even when a pair of species might be closely related. Their system was a precursor of the binomial nomenclature introduced by Carl Linnaeus. Birkhead explicates Francis Willoughby's role in helping to found the Royal Society of London and asking some questions that were far ahead of their time.

The first chapter of The Wonderful Mr Willughby briefly describes the social and political background of Francis Willughby's life. During his schooldays, the English Civil War was raging. His family were one of the few families of Royalist sympathisers who were lucky enough to escape the war unscathed. When Francis Willughby attended the University of Cambridge, there were four social classes of undergraduate students. The lowest class, the sub-sizars were below the sizars, who in turn were socially inferior to the fellow-commoners and the highest class, the sons of nobleman. Willughby was a fellow-commoner. His tutor John Ray was a blacksmith's son and had been admitted in 1644 to what is now called St Catharine's College, Cambridge as a sizar and transferred in 1646 to Trinity College, Cambridge. There John Ray was elected a Fellow in 1649 and as a mathematics lecturer arranged for Francis Willughby to be tutored by Isaac Barrow.

According to Birkhead, at Cambridge in the middle of the 17th century there was intellectual ferment that challenged the authority of Aristotle and the Bible. In the late 1650s, Willoughby and Ray performed “chymical” experiments similar to those done by Robert Boyle. In England and Wales, Willughby and Ray conducted many birding and plant-hunting expeditions. In 1662, Ray resigned his college fellowship, rather than take the oath in support of the Royalist Act of Uniformity. As a wealthy landowner, Willughby invited his former tutor into his household.

Birkhead's book gives details of the three major expeditions conducted by Willughby and Ray. In August 1660, the pair went to the Isle of Man and to England's west coast. In 1662 they went to Wales and Cornwall. Their most important expedition took place from April 1663 to December 1664 across the western part of continental Europe.

In 1663 Willughby, Ray, and Ray's students Philip Skippon and Nathaniel Bacon embarked on a research journey in the western part of continental Europe. The four naturalists started in the Low Countries and travelled by cart, by barge, on foot, and on horseback. They gradually worked their way through Germany and Italy, exploring countrysides and waterways. They spent three months in Venice. The four attended university lectures, visited naturalists' cabinets of curiosities, collected birds' eggs, purchased drawings and paintings of animals and plants, and visited songbird markets in search of specimens. They collected and dissected ornithological specimens, visited Ulisse Aldrovandi's museum in Bologna, and attended human dissections. Of the four companions, Willoughby alone ventured into Catholic Spain with its anti-Protestantism. Willughby and Ray accumulated a great deal of material and, upon their return to England, they began its organisation with the intention of publishing on each major grouping. Ray lived on Willughby's estate as the latter had a family and managed the landholdings.

When Willughby died in 1672, Ray began preparing an ornithology book based on Willoughby's notes. The book was published in 1678 with the title The Ornithology of Francis Willughby of Middleton in the County of Warwick, Esq.

The 2018 biography's final chapters explicate Ray's efforts after 1672 to publish Willoughby's writings. The chapters thoroughly explore Willoughby's works and their ornithological significance — without diminishing Ray.

In the last chapter, Birkhead points out that the plant genus Willughbeia, a fish species, and a bee species have been named in honour of Willughby but there is no such ornithological eponym. Birkhead argues that the European honey buzzard, which Willughby distinguished from the common buzzard, should be renamed "Willughby's buzzard".

== Reception ==
Reviewers were generally enthusiastic in praising the biography. The Wonderful Mr Willughby was acclaimed as well-written and beautifully illustrated. The favourable review in The Christian Science Monitor cautions that Birkhead sometimes uses terms, such as "hemipene" and "cloaca", without defining or clarifying the terms for readers unfamiliar with ornithology.
