= Belinda Bauer (author) =

British writer of crime novels

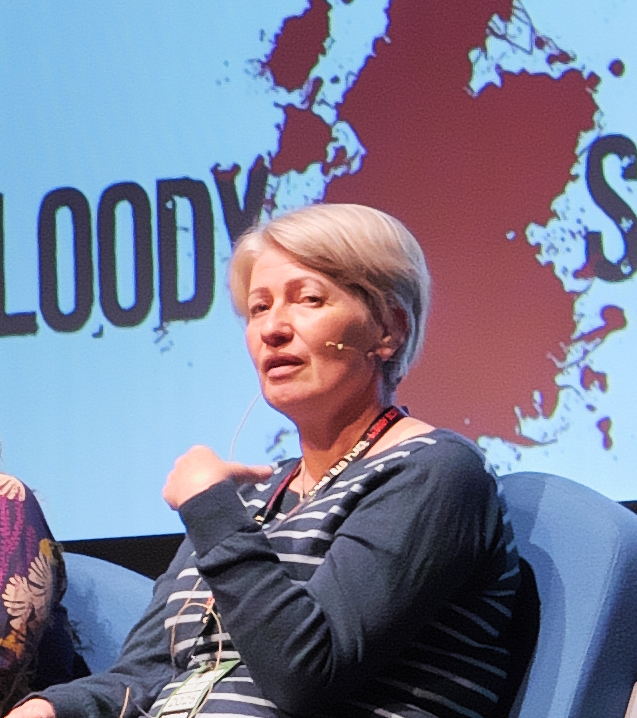
Belinda Bauer

Belinda Bauer (born 1962) is a British writer of crime novels. She grew up in England and South Africa, but later moved to Wales, where she worked as a court reporter in Cardiff; the country is often used as a setting in her work. She spent seven years as a screenwriter before writing her first novel at age 45.

== Early life ==
Bauer is originally from Bromley, on the edge of London and Kent, the daughter of a dentist and dental nurse. She has four sisters. As a child, Bauer lived in South Africa for ten years before returning to England, settling in Devon. She studied journalism at Cardiff University.

== Literary career ==
Bauer's debut novel, Blacklands, won the British Crime Writers' Association's Gold Dagger for the best crime novel of 2010. She told a reporter she had been surprised to learn her book would be considered crime fiction because it wasn't a whodunit. She felt "pigeonholed" by genre expectations while writing her first three books, a trilogy set around Exmoor in Somerset, though later became convinced it was possible to tell stories of all kinds within the crime fiction genre.

She was awarded the 2013 CWA Dagger in the Library. In 2014, her book Rubbernecker, set in Cardiff and Brecon, won the Theakston's Old Peculier Crime Novel of the Year Award. In July 2018 Bauer's novel, Snap, was longlisted for that year's Man Booker Prize, which was considered unusual for a work of crime fiction. It also won the Specsavers National Book Award for best crime/thriller in 2018.

In addition to crime novels, she published a thriller, High Rollers, under the name Jack Bowman, in 2013.

Bauer's crime novel The Impossible Thing is based on the real story of the Metland Egg, which she heard about in a radio interview with Tim Birkhead, where he talked about his book The Most Perfect Thing: Inside (and Outside) a Bird's Egg. The Impossible Thing was nominated for Best Mystery in the 2026 Barry Awards.

== Bibliography ==
=== Novels ===
- Blacklands (2009)
- Darkside (2011)
- Finders Keepers (2012)
- Rubbernecker (2013)
- The Facts of Life and Death (2014)
- The Shut Eye (2015)
- The Beautiful Dead (2016)
- Snap (2018)
- Exit (2021)
- The Impossible Thing (2025)

=== As Jack Bowman ===
- High Rollers (2013)
