= Damer Leslie Allen =

Irish-born British aviator

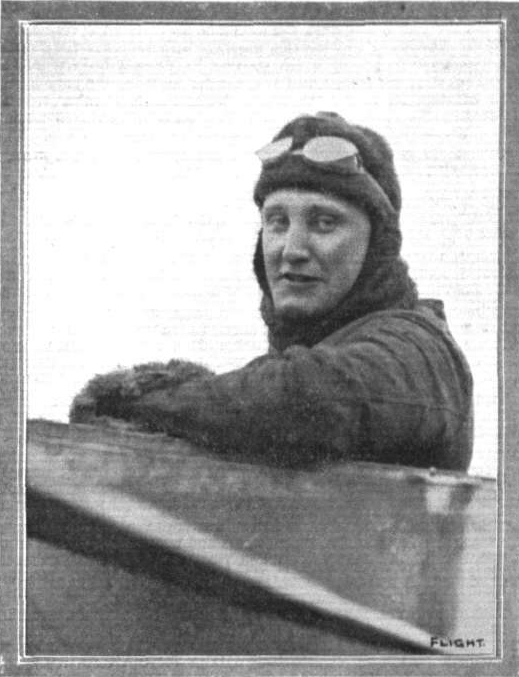
- Portrait in Flight magazine, 27 April 1912
- Born: 30 January 1878; Limerick, Ireland
- Died: 18 April 1912 (aged 34); Irish Sea
- Cause of death: Air accident
- Known for: Disappeared on 18 April 1912 while attempting to fly from Wales to Ireland
- Aviation career
- Flight license: 20 February 1912; London

Damer Leslie Allen (30 January 1878 – disappeared 18 April 1912) was an Irish-born British aviator. He disappeared in April 1912 while attempting to fly from Holyhead, Wales, to Ireland in a Blériot monoplane, and was presumed dead shortly after.

Allen had initially set off from Hendon Aerodrome together with his friend and fellow pilot Denys Corbett Wilson who successfully completed his flight to Ireland, the first complete flight between Great Britain and Ireland, on 22 April. Although it was reported that their flights were the result of a wager between the two men, this was subsequently denied.

The following week, on 26 April, Vivian Hewitt successfully completed a flight between Holyhead and Dublin, landing in the Phoenix Park. Interviewed by the press, he expressed the view that Allen had been insufficiently experienced as an aviator for a flight of such difficulty.

== Disappearance and aftermath ==
On 24 June 1912, the High Court in London made an order that Allen should be presumed to have died on or after 18 April 1912. A consulting engineer by profession, Allen left an estate valued at £6,923 15s 8d. At the time of his death, Allen was being sued in the English courts for the recovery of a portrait of Lady Anne Ponsonby by Thomas Gainsborough, which he had sold at Christie's for 8,300 guineas (£8,715). On 11 February 1913, after a seven-day trial, the jury returned a verdict for the defendants, including the executors of Allen's will.

== See also ==
- List of people who disappeared mysteriously at sea
