= Euan Dunn =

British ornithologist, evolutionary biologist and marine conservationist

Euan Dunn MBE
- Born: Aberdeen, Scotland
- Education: Durham University (PhD)
- Awards: Member of the Order of the British Empire (2007); RSPB Medal (2024)
- Scientific career
- Fields: Ornithology; Evolutionary biology; Population ecology; Marine conservation; Fisheries management
- Institutions: Edward Grey Institute of Field Ornithology; Royal Society for the Protection of Birds

Euan K. Dunn MBE is a British ornithologist, evolutionary biologist, author, illustrator and marine conservationist.He conducted research in population ecology and seabird ecology before joining the Royal Society for the Protection of Birds (RSPB) in 1994, where he held senior marine-policy roles including Head of Marine Policy and Principal Marine Adviser. His work has concerned the effects of commercial fishing on seabirds, the integration of environmental objectives into fisheries policy, and international measures to reduce seabird bycatch.

Dunn was appointed Member of the Order of the British Empire in 2007 for services to marine conservation and received the RSPB Medal in 2024.

== Early life and education ==
Dunn was born in Aberdeen into a family with longstanding connections to commercial fishing. His grandfather was a fisherman who worked on the Dogger Bank, while his father became fisheries correspondent and Aberdeen editor of The Scotsman. Dunn studied zoology at the University of Aberdeen before beginning doctoral research at Durham University in 1967 on the feeding ecology of terns on Coquet Island.

== Ornithological research ==
Dunn completed doctoral research at Durham University before joining the Edward Grey Institute of Field Ornithology at the University of Oxford. At Wytham Woods, he used records from the long-running study of breeding tits to investigate reproductive timing and predation. A 1976 paper examined the laying dates of four tit species, while a subsequent study analysed the relationship between least weasel predation, the density of nesting tits and the abundance of rodents.

== Marine conservation ==
Dunn joined the Royal Society for the Protection of Birds as a marine policy officer in 1994 and subsequently became Head of Marine Policy and Principal Marine Adviser. His work included fisheries policy, marine spatial planning, seabird bycatch and the effects of climate change and commercial fishing on marine food webs.

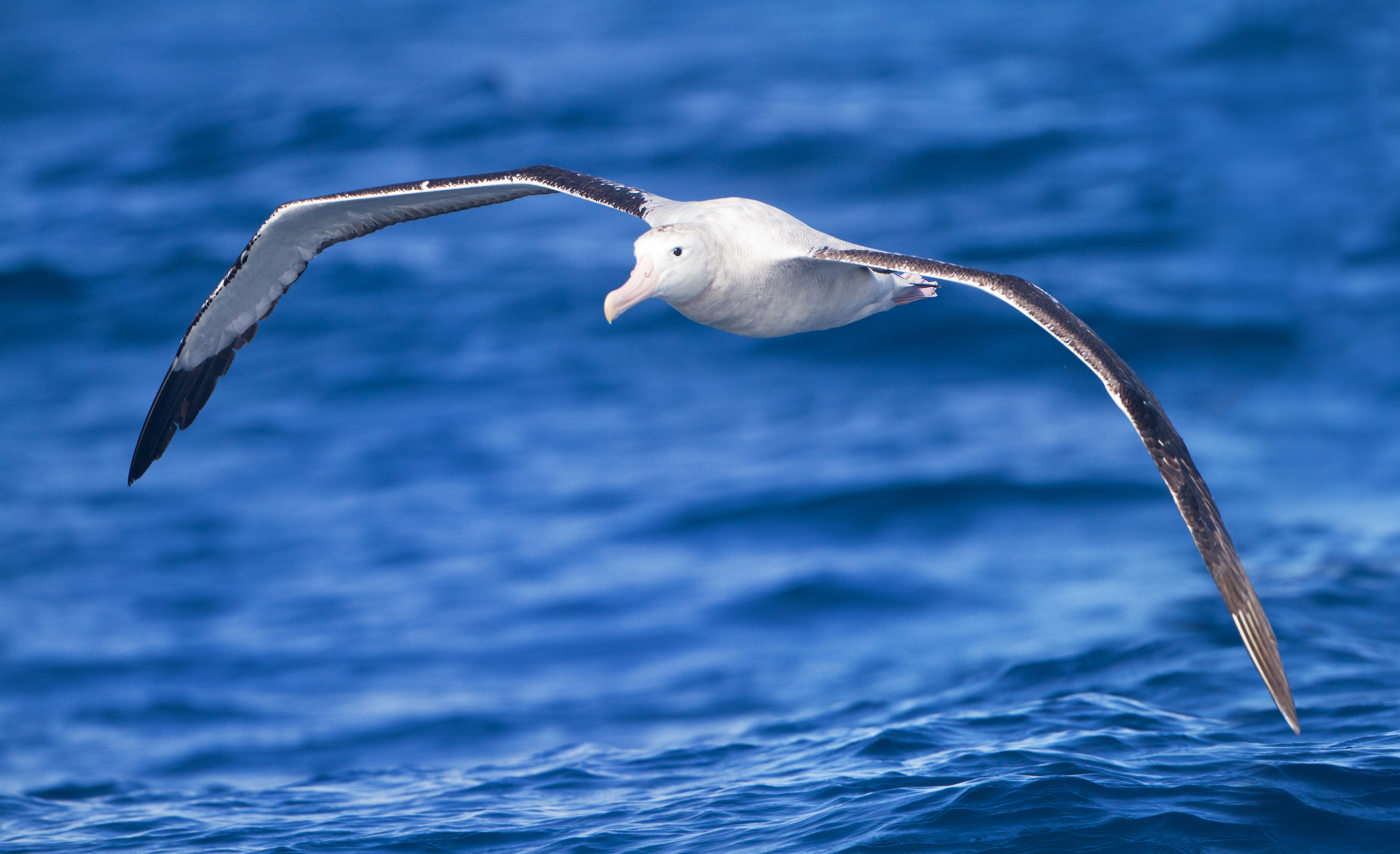
A wandering albatross in flight. Dunn contributed to the establishment of BirdLife International's Albatross Task Force, which promotes measures to reduce seabird bycatch in fisheries.

He represented BirdLife International on the North Sea Advisory Council and chaired its Ecosystem Working Group. He also contributed to the establishment of BirdLife International's marine programme and its Albatross Task Force, which developed and promoted measures intended to reduce the incidental capture of albatrosses and other seabirds in fishing gear. In 2005, The Independent described Dunn as "one of the world's leading experts on albatross conservation" in its coverage of the effects of industrial longline fishing on albatross populations and the international campaign to reduce seabird mortality.

Dunn gave evidence on fisheries and marine environmental policy to committees of both Houses of the Parliament of the United Kingdom. In evidence concerning the Common Fisheries Policy, he addressed the effects of industrial sandeel fishing and changing marine conditions on seabirds, as well as marine protected areas, fisheries subsidies, discarding and ecosystem-based fisheries management.

Dunn became involved in efforts to restrict industrial fishing for sandeels in the North Sea following a fisheries meeting in Norway in 1996. The RSPB subsequently campaigned for restrictions on the fishery because of the importance of sandeels as prey for breeding seabirds. The organisation credited Dunn with playing a significant role in the decisions of the United Kingdom and Scottish governments in 2024 to close industrial sandeel fisheries in English waters of the North Sea and in Scottish waters.

== Post-retirement environmental advocacy ==
After retiring from the RSPB, Dunn became involved with Cambridge Approaches, a grassroots campaign group concerned with the proposed Bedford–Cambridge section of East West Rail.

In a 2025 guest article, he argued that the preferred southern route posed risks to the Eversden and Wimpole Woods Special Area of Conservation and its population of barbastelle bats.

== Writing, illustration and editorial work ==
Dunn has written scientific papers and works of popular ornithology. His books include The Colourful World of Birds and RSPB Spotlight: Puffins. He was also a contributor to the nine-volume The Birds of the Western Palearctic and served for thirteen years as natural-history editor of The Countryman.

Dunn has also worked as a natural-history illustrator, producing illustrations for books about birds and marine mammals. Among the works he illustrated was Peter G. H. Evans's Whales, published by Whittet Books in 1990.

== Honours ==
Dunn was appointed Member of the Order of the British Empire in 2007 for services to marine conservation, including his involvement in BirdLife International's Save the Albatross campaign.

In 2024, he received the RSPB Medal, the organisation's principal award, in recognition of his contribution to marine conservation and fisheries policy.

== Selected publications ==
=== Books ===
- Dunn, Euan K. (1976). The Colourful World of Birds. London: Sundial. ISBN 978-0-904230-16-1.
- Dunn, Euan (2018). RSPB Spotlight: Puffins. London: Bloomsbury Natural History. ISBN 978-1-4729-6520-2.

=== Selected illustrated works ===
- Evans, Peter G. H. (1990). Whales. Illustrations by Euan Dunn. London: Whittet Books. ISBN 978-0-905483-85-6. OCLC 22002082.

=== Selected articles ===
- Dunn, E. K. (1972). "Effect of age on the fishing ability of Sandwich Terns Sterna sandvicensis". Ibis. 114 (3): 360–366. doi:10.1111/j.1474-919X.1972.tb00833.x.
- Dunn, E. K. (1973). "Changes in fishing ability of terns associated with windspeed and sea surface conditions". Nature. 244: 520–521. doi:10.1038/244520a0.
- Dunn, E. K. (1975). "The role of environmental factors in the growth of tern chicks". Journal of Animal Ecology. 44 (3): 743–754. doi:10.2307/3716.
- Dunn, E. K. (1976). "Laying dates of four species of tits in Wytham Wood, Oxfordshire". British Birds. 69: 45–50.
- Dunn, Euan (1977). "Predation by Weasels (Mustela nivalis) on Breeding Tits (Parus spp.) in Relation to the Density of Tits and Rodents". Journal of Animal Ecology. 46 (2): 633–652. doi:10.2307/3835.
- Anderson, Orea R. J.; Small, Cleo J.; Croxall, John P.; Dunn, Euan K.; Sullivan, Benedict J.; Yates, Oliver; Black, Andrew (2011). "Global seabird bycatch in longline fisheries". Endangered Species Research. 14 (2): 91–106. doi:10.3354/esr00347.
- Carroll, Matthew J.; Bolton, Mark; Owen, Ellie; Anderson, Guy Q. A.; Mackley, Elizabeth K.; Dunn, Euan K.; Furness, Robert W. (2017). "Kittiwake breeding success in the southern North Sea correlates with prior sandeel fishing mortality". Aquatic Conservation: Marine and Freshwater Ecosystems. 27 (6): 1164–1175. doi:10.1002/aqc.2780.
