= The Most Perfect Thing =

2016 book by Tim Birkhead

- Author: Tim Birkhead
- Language: English
- Genre: Popular science
- Publisher: Bloomsbury Publishing
- Publication date: 2016 (hardback); 2017 (paperback); 2018 (Chinese edition, 世界上最完美的物件 : 鳥蛋)
- Media type: Print
- ISBN: 978-1632863690
- OCLC: 946067741

The Most Perfect Thing: Inside (and Outside) a Bird's Egg is a popular science book by Tim Birkhead. It was first published in 2016, and was shortlisted for the Royal Society Science Book Prize. It was awarded the 2016 Zoological Society Award for Communicating Zoology.

== Background ==
In the preface, Birkhead relates that the genesis of the book lay in a mistake by a television presenter, who incorrectly explained the reason for the pyriform (pointed) shape of a guillemot egg, by spinning a blown egg and showing that it rotated on the spot and did not roll. Birkhead, who had been studying guillemots for forty years, knew this to be a long-debunked myth, but when looking at scientific papers to send to the presenter, Birkhead realised the science was not as clear cut as he had thought. His reinvestigation of the science of guillemot eggs led to both further research on bird egg shape and to this book.

The book takes its title from a quote by the American abolitionist Thomas Wentworth Higginson, who wrote in 1862, "I think that, if required on pain of death to name instantly the most perfect thing in the universe, I should risk my fate on a bird's egg."

== Contents ==
The first chapter, Climmers and collectors, focuses on the commercial harvesting of guillemot eggs from the seabird colonies at Bempton Cliffs, in Yorkshire. This activity peaked in the 1930s, with the act of collection itself becoming a tourist attraction. Chapters 2 and 3 outline how an egg is created and shaped. Chapters 4 and 5 deal with pigmentation, and why bird eggs are coloured. In Chapters 6 and 7, Birkhead describes the albumen and yolk, and in Chapter 8, the laying and hatching processes.

== Reception ==
The book received a number of positive reviews. A review in The Auk said the book "excels especially in its stories (including those egg-collecting yarns), Dr. Birkhead's own observations and impromptu tests, cameos by devoted egg curators and sharp field biologists, and various tangents ranging from viper semelparity to women incubating eggs in their cleavage". In The Spectator, Horatio Clare said "anyone drawn to the natural sciences will relish it". In The Observer, Alex Preston wrote "Birkhead's approach to writing – hard, clear sentences; deep, revelatory looking – has the same effect as his powerful microscope, bringing objects to light that were previously hidden, making us see the familiar with new eyes".

The book inspired the 2018 BBC documentary Attenborough's Wonder of Eggs, featuring Birkhead and David Attenborough, and produced by Mike Birkhead.

== Awards and recognition ==
In 2016 The Most Perfect Thing was shortlisted for the Royal Society's Science Book Prize. It was also listed on the Forbes list of twelve best books about birds or birding for 2016. The book was awarded the 2016 Zoological Society of London's Award for Communicating Zoology.
