= Denys Corbett Wilson =

Irish aviator (1882-1915)

- Born: 1882
- Died: 10 May 1915; Vicinity of Fournes-en-Weppes, France
- Cause of death: Killed in action
- Resting place: Grave/Memorial Reference: XV.M.38. Cabaret-Rouge British Cemetery, Souchez, France
- Known for: Made the first complete flight from Great Britain to Ireland
- Aviation career
- Air force: Royal Flying Corps

Denys Corbett Wilson (1882 – 10 May 1915) was a pioneering Irish aviator.

Wilson was commissioned a lieutenant in the 3rd (Militia) of the Dorsetshire Regiment on 14 November 1900, and resigned this commission on 4 March 1903.

He is most notable for his 100-minute flight on 22 April 1912, from Goodwick in Pembrokeshire to Crane near Enniscorthy in county Wexford – from the island of Great Britain to the island of Ireland. The journey time was 1 hour 40 minutes. There is a memorial plaque within the grounds of Enniscorthy Castle.

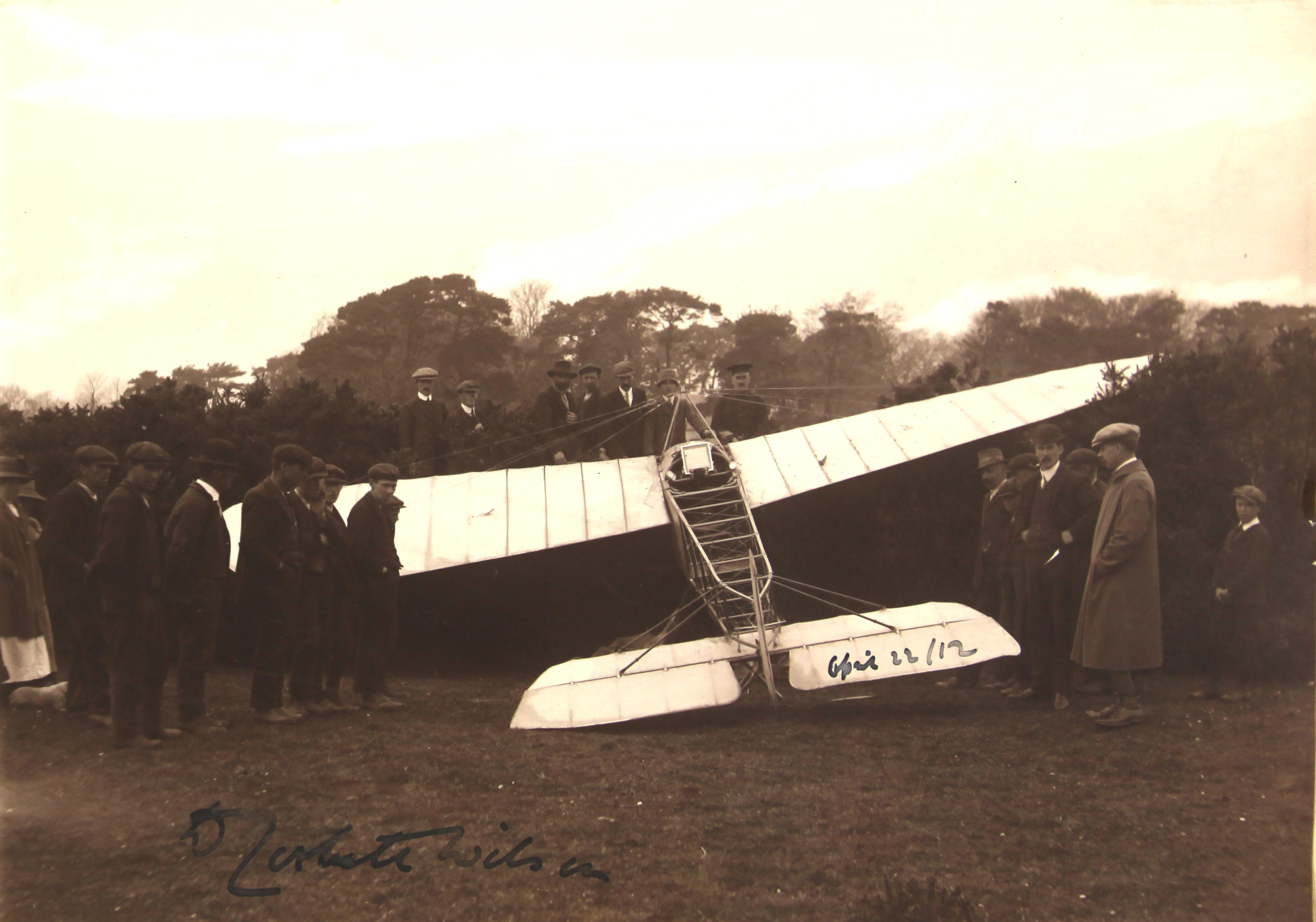
Corbett Wilson's Bleriot XI crash landed.

This was the first complete flight between Britain and Ireland; an earlier flight had been made by actor-aviator Robert Loraine on 11 September 1910. Loraine flew from Wales (part of Great Britain) but landed 300 to 400 yards short of the Irish coast at Dublin, Ireland.

Wilson had initially set off from Hendon Aerodrome on 17 April 1912 in his Bleriot XI monoplane in a race against his friend and fellow pilot Damer Leslie Allen, also flying a Bleriot, who disappeared the following day over the Irish Sea while attempting a flight from Holyhead, Wales to Ireland. Corbett-Wilson meanwhile was forced to land near Hereford and booked into the Mitre Hotel. Rather than wait for his mechanic to arrive, he decided to purchase petrol and oil locally. The oil (castor oil was used at the time) however turned out to be the wrong grade and on resuming his flight the following morning he was once again forced down because of engine trouble. This time he landed in Colva, Radnorshire where he wisely waited for his mechanic to arrive. It was on 21 April he took off and decided to head west instead of north for Chester and Holyhead as the original plan. He arrived at a field near Harbour Village, Goodwick, around mid-morning. The historic flight to Ireland took place on the 22nd of April. Wilson began his flight at 6 a.m, taking off from Goodwick. When he was 20 miles from the coast of Wexford he flew into a heavy storm. His compass went out of order so he flew blindly for 40 minutes until he eventually made a hasty descent in a field in Enniscorthy.

The achievement was commemorated in Centenary Celebrations held in Fishguard and Goodwick on the weekend of 21/22 April 2012 and in a specially commissioned stage play by Derek Webb, called '100 Minutes' which was performed at Theatr Gwaun in Fishguard and Wexford the same week.

A Lieutenant serving in the Third Squadron, Royal Flying Corps, on 10 May 1915 Corbett-Wilson and his observer were on a reconnaissance mission in a Morane Parasol when their aircraft was struck by an enemy shell. Both were reported to have been killed instantly.

He is buried in the Cabaret-Rouge British Cemetery, Souchez, France.

== See also ==
- List of Irish Sea crossings by air
