= Piriform =

Piriform, sometimes pyriform, means pear-shaped. It may refer to:

== Anatomy ==
- Piriform aperture, more commonly known as anterior nasal aperture
- Piriform cortex, a region in the brain
- Piriformis muscle, a gluteal muscle
  - Piriformis syndrome, a neuromuscular disorder in which the piriformis muscle compresses the sciatic nerve
- Piriform sinus, piriform recess or piriform fossa, synonyms referring to one of the four sites of the hypopharynx
- The (notionally) pear-like female body shape (gynoid shape)
  - Pear-shaped obesity (adiposity highest on hips and thighs), in contrast with apple-shaped obesity (central adiposity, abdominal obesity)

== Other uses ==
- Piriform Software, a software company
- Piriform, in hydrostatic equilibrium
- Pyriform, a teapot shape introduced in the 18th century
