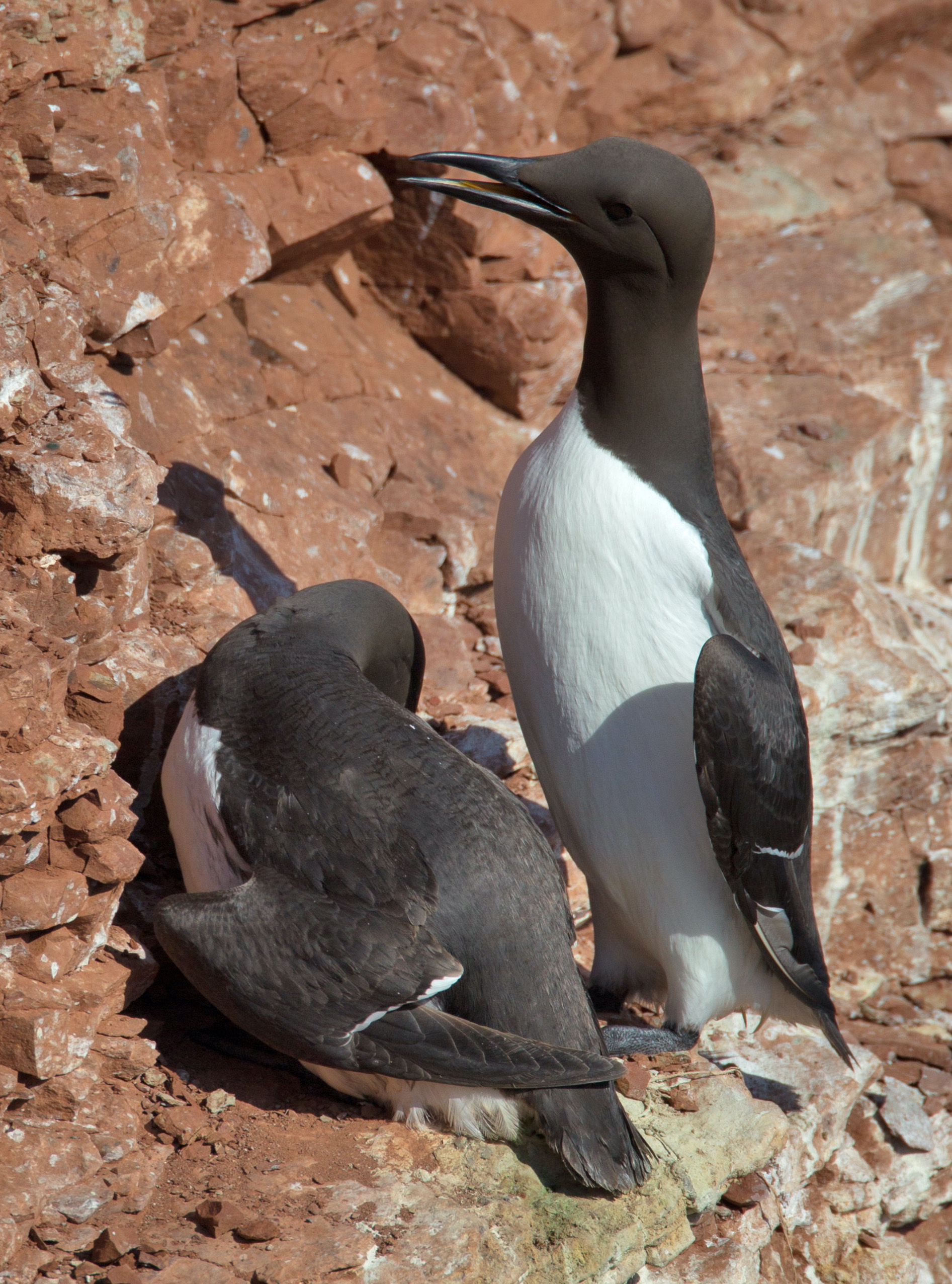

Conservation status
- Least Concern (IUCN 3.1)

Scientific classification
- Kingdom: Animalia
- Phylum: Chordata
- Class: Aves
- Order: Charadriiformes
- Family: Alcidae
- Genus: Uria
- Species: U. aalge

Binomial name
- Uria aalge (Pontoppidan, 1763)

Synonyms
- Colymbus aalge Pontoppidan, 1763; Colymbus troile Linnaeus, 1766; Uria troile Linnaeus

Audio
- Bird calls recorded in Pembrokeshire, Wales

= Common murre =

Species of bird

The common murre or common guillemot (Uria aalge) is a large auk, one of several species called murre or guillemot. It has a circumpolar distribution, occurring in low-Arctic and boreal waters in the North Atlantic and North Pacific. It spends most of its time at sea, only coming to land to breed on rocky cliff shores or islands.

Common murres are fast in direct flight but are not very agile. They are highly mobile underwater using their wings to 'fly' through the water column, where they typically dive to depths of 30–60 m (100–195 ft). Depths of up to 180 m (590 ft) have been recorded.

Common murres breed in colonies at high densities. Nesting pairs may be in bodily contact with their neighbours. They make no nest; their single egg is incubated between the adult's feet on a bare rock ledge on a cliff face. Eggs hatch after ~30 days' incubation. The chick is born downy and can regulate its body temperature after 10 days. Some 20 days after hatching, the chick leaves its nesting ledge and heads for the sea, unable to fly, but gliding for some distance with fluttering wings, accompanied by its male parent. Male guillemots spend more time diving, and dive more deeply than females during this time. Chicks are capable of diving as soon as they hit the water. The female stays at the nest site for some 14 days after the chick has left.

Both male and female common murres moult after breeding and become flightless for 1–2 months. Some populations have short migration distances, instead remaining close to the breeding site year-round. Such populations return to the nest site from autumn onwards. Adult birds balance their energetic budgets during the winter by reducing the time that they spend flying and are able to forage nocturnally.

== Taxonomy ==
The common murre was formally described and illustrated in 1763 by the Danish bishop Erik Pontoppidan under the binomial name Colymbus aalge. The type locality is Iceland. The species is now placed together with the thick-billed murre in the genus Uria that was described in 1760 by the French zoologist Mathurin Jacques Brisson. The genus name is from Ancient Greek ouria, a waterbird mentioned by Athenaeus. The specific epithet aalge is an old Danish word for an auk.

The auks are a family of seabirds related to the gulls and terns which contains several genera. The common murre is placed in the guillemot (murre) genus Uria (Brisson, 1760), which it shares with the thick-billed murre or Brunnich's guillemot, U. lomvia. These species, together with the razorbill, little auk and the extinct great auk make up the tribe Alcini. This arrangement was originally based on analyses of auk morphology and ecology.

The official common name for this species is Common Murre according to the IOC World Bird List, Version 11.2. while Common Guillemot is used in the UK, Ireland, and often elsewhere in Europe where English is used as a second language.

Five subspecies are now recognised:

- U. a. aalge (Pontoppidan, 1763) – coastal southeast Canada, southwest Greenland, Iceland, Faroe Islands, Scotland, south Norway and Baltic Sea. Includes intermedia and spiloptera.
- U. a. hyperborea Salomonsen, 1932 – coastal north Norway to Svalbard and Novaya Zemlya (northwest Russia)
- U. a. albionis Witherby, 1923 – coastal British Isles, Heligoland (north of Germany), northwest France and west Iberian Peninsula
- U. a. inornata Salomonsen, 1932 – coastal Kamchatka Peninsula, Sakhalin, Kuril and Commander Islands (east Russia), south Kuril Islands (north Japan), Teuri Island (northwest of Hokkaido; formerly also Hokkaido; north Japan); Aleutian Islands and Bering Sea islands to west Alaska and southwest Canada
- U. a. californica (Bryant, H, 1861) – coastal north Washington to south California (east North Pacific)

== Description ==
The common murre is 38–46 cm (15–18 in) in length with a 61–73 cm (24–29 in) wingspan. Male and female are indistinguishable in the field and weight ranges between 945 g (2 lb 1 1/2 oz) in the south of their range and 1,044 g (2 lb 5 oz) in the north. A weight range of 775–1,250 g (1 lb 11 1/2 oz – 2 lb 12 oz) has been reported. In breeding plumage, the nominate subspecies U. a. aalge is black on the head, back and wings, and has white underparts. It has a thin dark pointed bill and a small rounded black tail. After the post-breeding moult, the face is white with a dark spur behind the eye, and there are often dark streaks on the flanks. Birds of the subspecies U. a. albionis are dark brown rather than black, most obviously so in colonies in southern Britain. The legs and the bill are dark grey. Occasionally, adults have been seen with yellow-grey legs. In May 2008, an aberrant adult was photographed with a bright yellow bill.

The adults moult into breeding plumage in December–February, even starting as early as November in U. a. albionis, and back into winter plumage soon after leaving the breeding colonies in July to August. The plumage of first winter birds is the same as the adult winter plumage. However, their moult into first summer plumage occurs later in the year than in adults. First year birds often remain in winter plumage as late as May, and their first summer plumage usually retains some white feathers around the throat.

Some individuals in the North Atlantic, known as "bridled guillemots", have a white ring around the eye extending back as a white line. This is not a distinct subspecies, but a polymorphism that becomes more common the farther north the birds breed.

The chicks are downy with blackish feathers on top and white below. By 12 days old, contour feathers are well developed in areas except for the head. At 15 days, facial feathers show the dark eyestripe against the white throat and cheek. They jump from the breeding cliffs at 20–21 days old, long before being fully fledged, and are cared for by the male parent at sea.

The common murre has a variety of calls, including a soft purring noise, but the main call of the adults, often deafening at large colonies, is a growling "murrrr"; the chicks have a food-begging call, a high-pitched whistle "willee", with considerable carrying power.

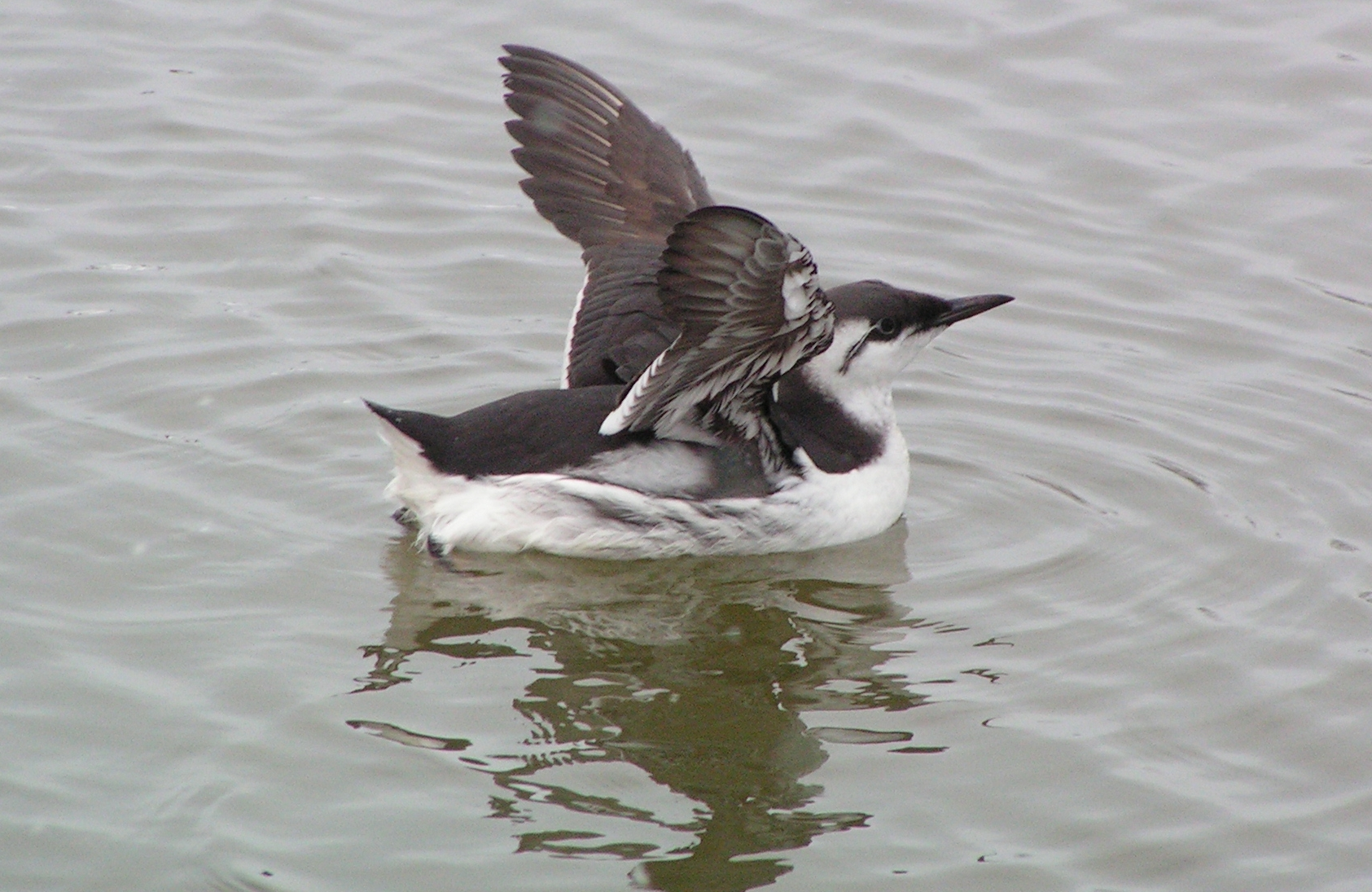
Adult in winter plumage, Germany

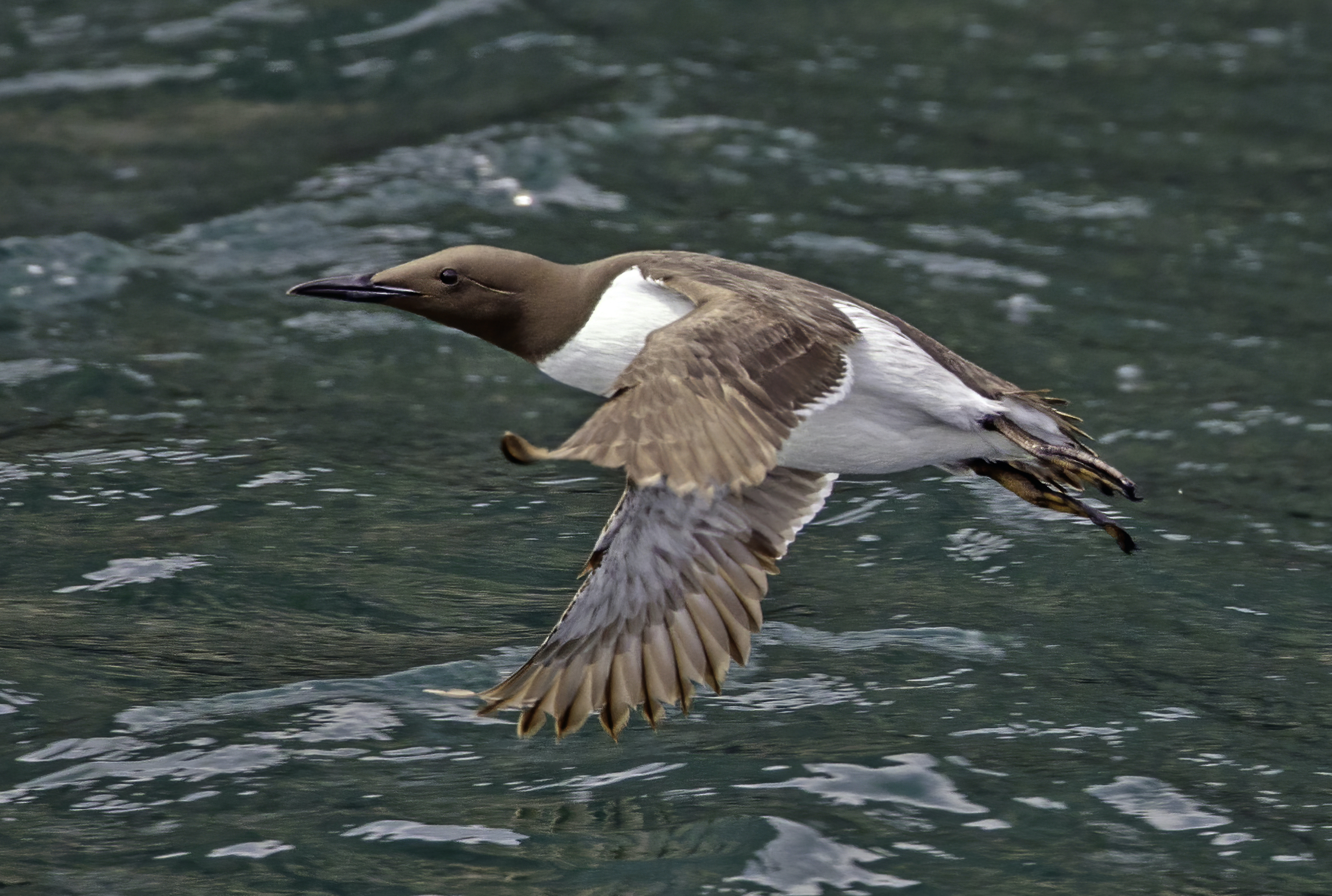
in flight off Skomer Island

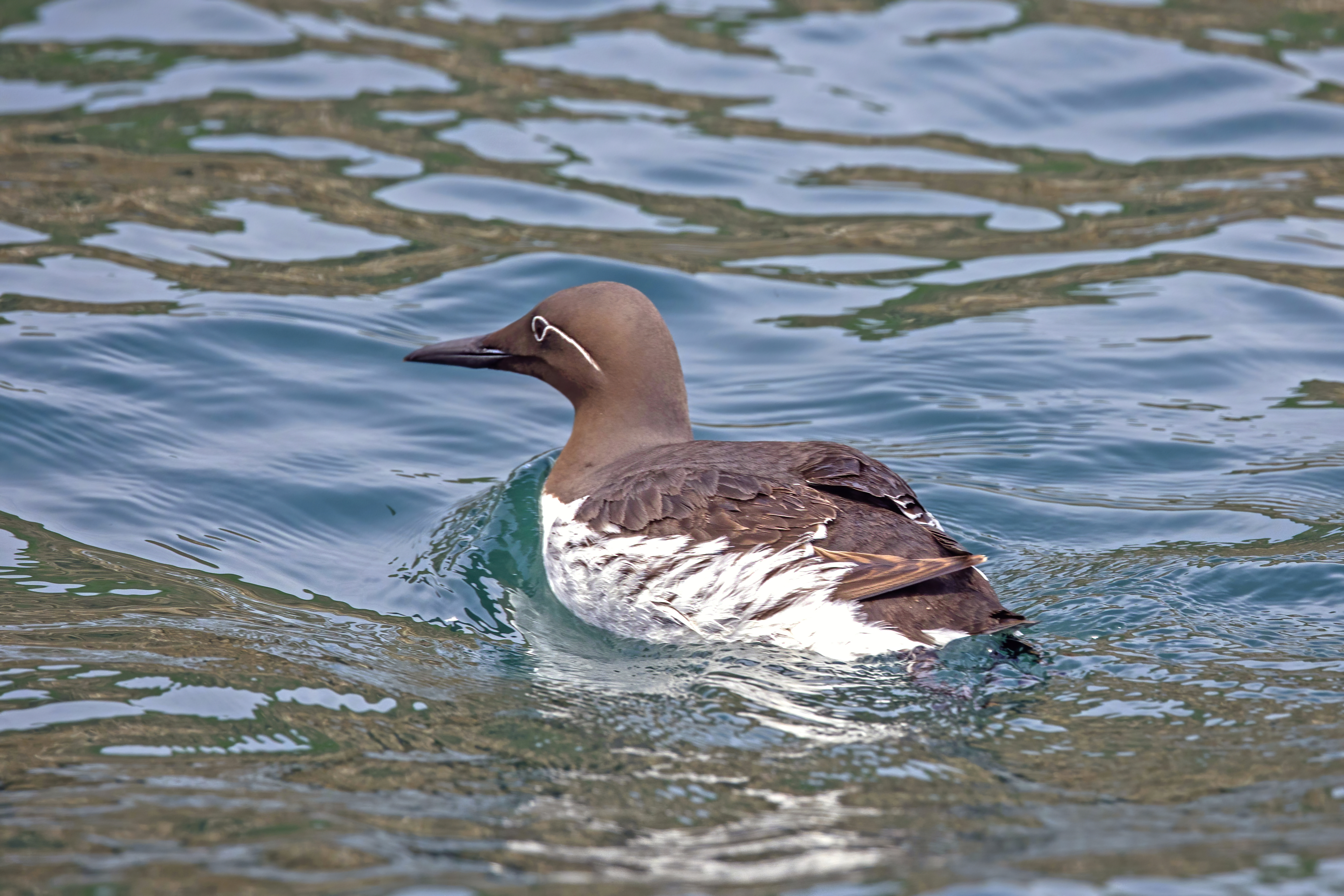
Mature 'bridled' bird (white eye ring)

=== Flight ===
The common murre flies with fast wing beats and has a flight speed of 80 km/h (50 mph). Groups of birds are often seen flying together in a line just above the sea surface. However, a high wing loading of 2 g/cm^{2} means that this species is not very agile and take-off is difficult. Common murres become flightless for 45–60 days while moulting their primary feathers. The sound of the wing beats of the murres are often described as similar to a helicopter.

=== Diving ===
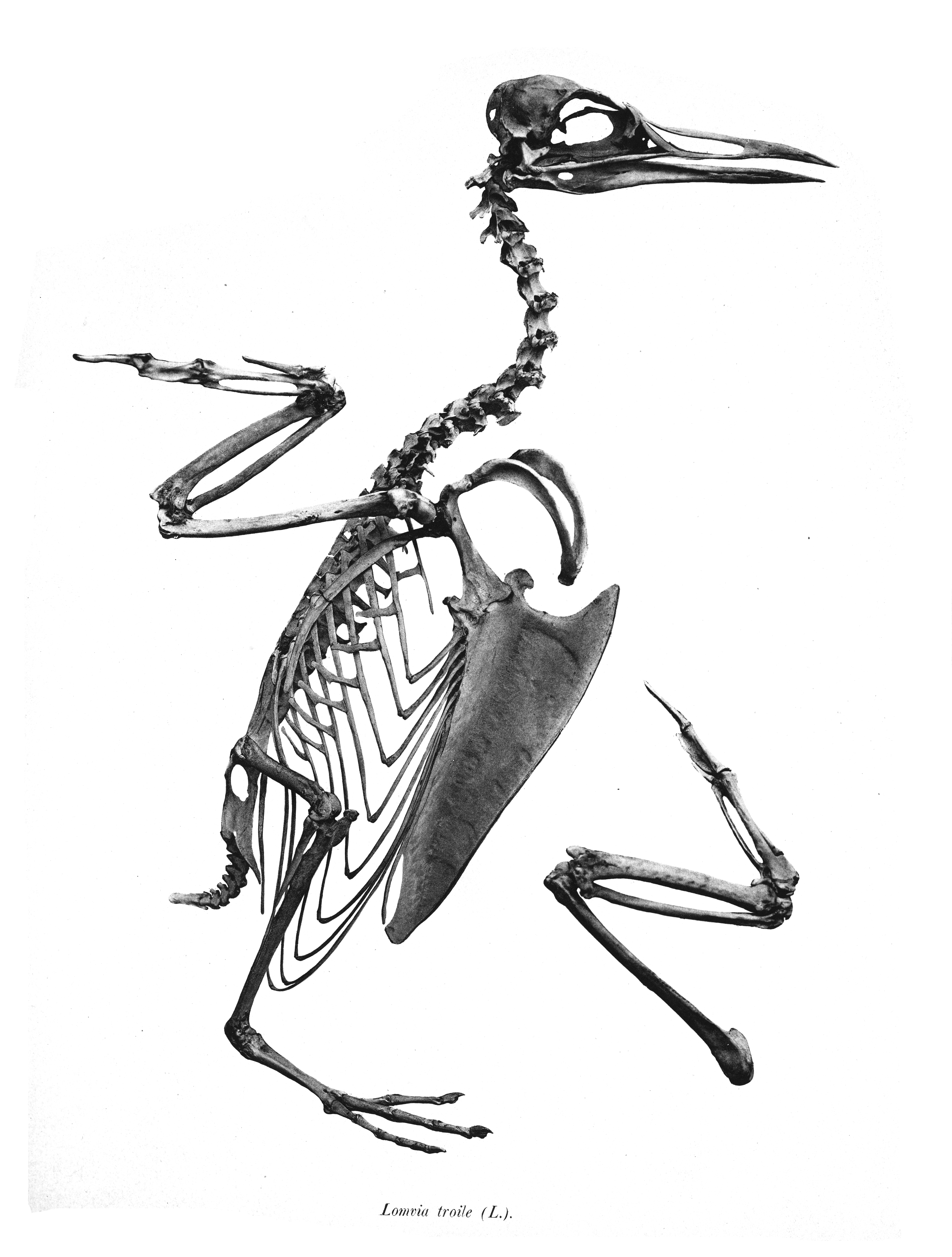
Skeleton

The common murre is a pursuit-diver that forages for food by swimming underwater using its wings for propulsion. Dives usually last less than one minute, but the bird swims underwater for distances of over 30 m (100 ft) on a regular basis. Diving depths up to 180 m (590 ft) have been recorded, and birds can remain underwater for a couple of minutes.

== Distribution and habitat ==
The breeding [habitat] is islands, rocky shores, cliffs and sea stacks. The population is large, perhaps 7.3 million breeding pairs or 18 million individuals. It had been stable, but in 2015–2016 a massive die-off of common murres in the northeast Pacific was associated with the 2014–2016 marine heatwave. About 62,000 dead or dying murres were documented along the Pacific coast from California to Alaska, with most examined birds severely emaciated. The mortality was attributed primarily to starvation following a large-scale reduction in the abundance and quality of forage fish.

The effects of the heatwave lasted for years at some colonies. A 2024 study of murres in Cook Inlet, Alaska showed that after the heatwave, colony attendance and reproductive success kept falling. At Gull Island murres could not fledge chicks from 2016 to 2018; by 2019 productivity had come back to about half of what it had been while the murre population had dropped by about half. The authors said that the long‑term demographic impact was mainly because of the loss of forage fish and changes in the quality of forage fish, with more predator disturbance and possibly other stresses. I think this shows how fragile these colonies are.

Some birds are permanent residents; northern birds [migrate] south to open waters near [New England], southern California, Japan, [Korea] and the western [Mediterranean]. UK populations are generally distributed near their breeding colonies year-round, but have been found to make long-distance migrations as far north as the [Barents Sea]. Common murres rest on the water in the winter and this may have consequences for their metabolism. In the [black-legged kittiwake] (which shares this winter habit) resting metabolism is 40% higher on water than it is in air.

== Behavior and ecology ==
=== Food and feeding ===
The common murre can venture far from its breeding grounds to forage; distances of 100 km (60 mi) and more are often observed though if sufficient food is available closer by, birds only travel much shorter distances. The common murre mainly eats small schooling forage fish 200 mm (8 in) long or less, such as polar cod, capelin, sand lances, sprats, sandeels, Atlantic cod and Atlantic herring. Capelin and sand lances are favourite food, but what the main prey is at any one time depends much on what is available in quantity. It also eats some molluscs, marine worms, squid, and crustaceans such as amphipods. It consumes 20–32 g (11/16–1 1/8 oz) of food in a day on average. It is often seen carrying fish in its bill with the tail hanging out.

The snake pipefish is occasionally eaten, but it has poor nutritional value. The amount of these fish is increasing in the common murre's diet. Since 2003, the snake pipefish has increased in numbers in the North-east Atlantic and North Sea and sandeel numbers have declined.

=== Breeding ===
==== Colonies ====
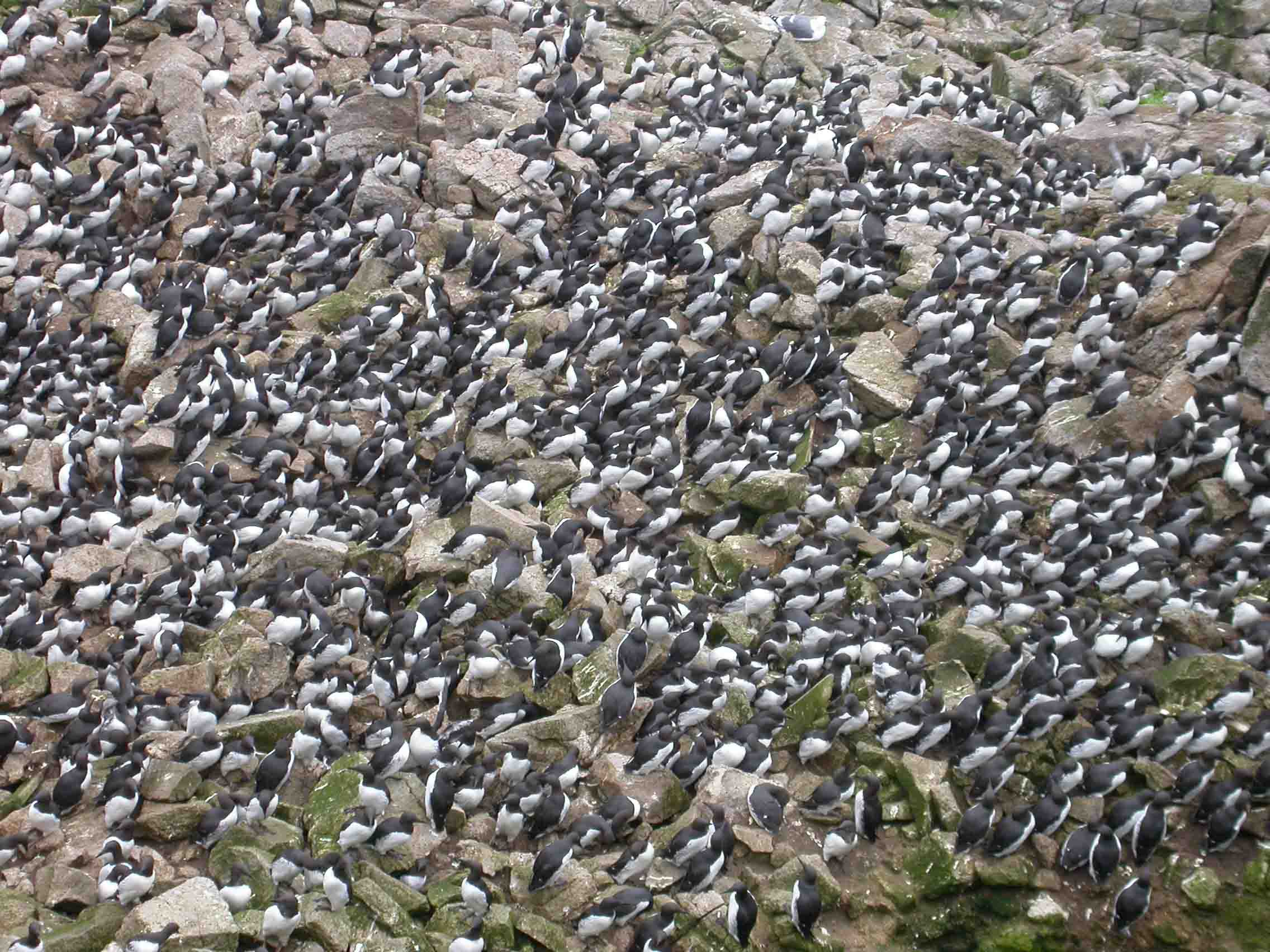
Part of a U. a. californica colony, Farallon Islands, California

The common murre nests in densely packed colonies (known as "loomeries"), with up to twenty pairs occupying one square metre at peak season. Common murres do not make nests and lay their eggs on bare rock ledges, under rocks, or the ground. Despite the high density of murre breeding sites, sites may vary greatly in their quality over small spatial scales. Pairs breeding at those sites of highest quality are more likely to be occupied by a breeding pairs at all population sizes, and more likely to successfully fledge a chick. They first breed at four to nine years old, but most individuals recruit into the breeding population at ages six or seven, although birds may disperse (permanently depart their natal colony) if space is limited. Annual survival probability for birds aged 6–15 is 0.895, and average lifespan is about 20 years. Breeding success increases with age up to age 9–10 to 0.7 fledglings per pair, then declines in the oldest age birds, perhaps indicating reproductive senescence.

High densities mean that birds are close contact with neighbouring breeders. Common murres perform appeasement displays more often at high densities and more often than razorbills. Allopreening is common both between mates and between neighbours. Allopreening helps to reduce parasites, and it may also have important social functions. Frequency of allopreening a neighbour correlates well with current breeding success. Allopreening may function as a stress-reducer; ledges with low levels of allopreening show increased levels of fighting and reduced breeding success.

==== Courtship ====
Courtship displays including bowing, billing and mutual preening. The male points its head vertically and makes croaking and growling noises to attract the females. The species is monogamous, but pairs may split if breeding is unsuccessful.

==== Eggs and incubation ====
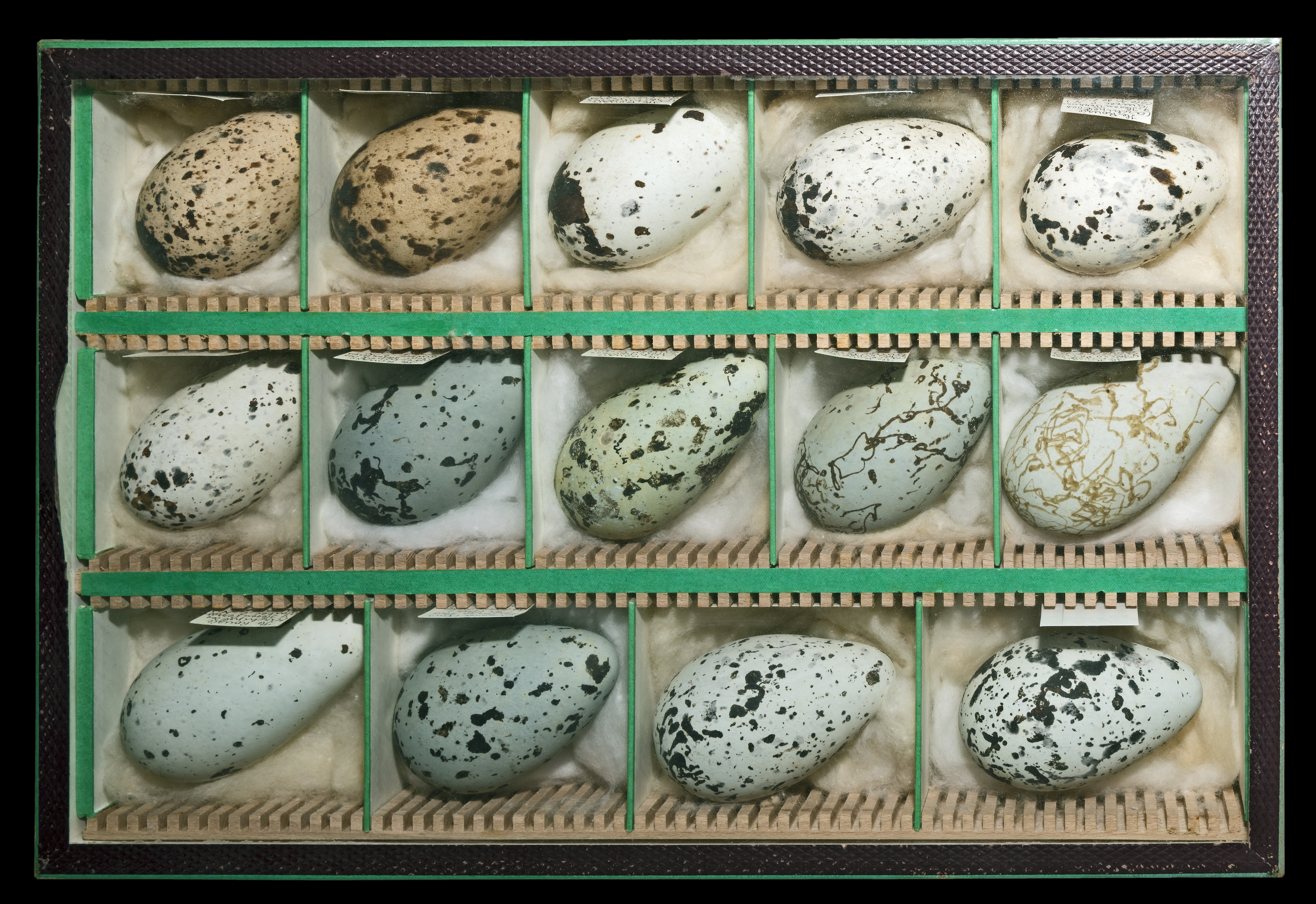
Murre eggs

Common murre eggs are large (around 11% of female weight), and are pointed at one end. The egg's pyriform shape is popularly ascribed the function of allowing the egg to spin on its axis or in an arc when disturbed, however there is no evidence to support this claim. Various hypotheses have arisen to explain the egg's shape:

1. Pyriform eggs are more stable on a sloping surface than more elliptical eggs, such as that of the razorbill.
2. The shape allows efficient heat transfer during incubation.
3. As a compromise between large egg size and small cross-section. Large size allows quick development of the chick. Small cross-sectional area allows the adult bird to have a small cross-section and therefore reduce drag when swimming.
4. Due to its pyriform shape, a higher proportion of the eggshell is in contact with the cliff minimising the effects of impact by neighbouring birds.
5. It helps to confine faecal contamination to the pointy end of the egg. The blunt end, where the embryo's head and air cell are located, is kept relatively free of debris, allowing gases to pass through the shell unimpeded;.

Eggs are laid between May and July for the Atlantic populations and March to July for those in the Pacific. The female spends less time ashore during the two weeks before laying. When laying, she assumes a "phoenix-like" posture: her body raised upright on vertical tarsi; wings half outstretched. The egg emerges point first and laying usually takes 5–10 minutes.

Herring gull steals an egg, Lundy

The eggs vary in colour and pattern to help the parents recognize them, each egg's pattern being unique. Colours include white, green, blue or brown with spots or speckles in black or lilac. Rarely, red eggs such as the Metland Egg have been collected, which were highly sought after by collectors. After laying, the female will look at the egg before starting the first incubation shift. Both parents incubate the egg using a single, centrally located brood patch for the 28 to 34 days to hatching in shifts of 1–38 hours.

Eggs can be lost due to predation or carelessness. Crows and gulls are opportunist egg thieves. Eggs are also knocked from ledges during fights. If the first egg is lost, the female may lay a second egg. This egg is usually lighter than the first, with a lighter yolk. Chicks from second eggs grow quicker than those from first eggs. However this rapid growth comes at a cost, first chicks have larger fat reserves and can withstand temporary shortages of food.

==== Growth of the chick ====
Chicks occupy an intermediate position between the precocial chicks of genus Synthliboramphus and the semi-precocial chicks of the Atlantic puffin. They are born downy and by 10 days old they are able to regulate their own temperature. Except in times of food shortage there is at least one parent present at all times, and both parents are present 10–30% of the time. Both parents alternate between brooding the chick or foraging for food.

Adults feeding chick, Lundy

Provisioning is usually divided equally between each parent, but unequal provisioning effort can lead to divorce. Common murres are single-prey loaders, this means that they carry one fish at time. The fish is held lengthways in the adult's bill, with the fish's tail hanging from the end of the beak. The returning adult will form its wings into a 'tent' to protect the chick. The adult points its head downwards and the chick swallows the fish head first.

Alloparenting behaviour is frequently observed. Non-breeding and failed breeders show great interest in other chicks, and will attempt to brood or feed them. This activity is more common as the chicks get older and begin to explore their ledge. There has also been a record of a pair managing to raise two chicks. Adults that have lost chicks or eggs will sometimes bring fish to the nest site and try to feed their imaginary chick.

At time of extreme food stress, the social activity of the breeding ledge can break down. On the Isle of May colony in 2007, food availability was low. Adults spent more of their time-budget foraging for their chicks and had to leave them unattended at times. Unattended chicks were attacked by breeding neighbours which often led to their deaths. Non-breeding and failed breeders continued to show alloparental care.

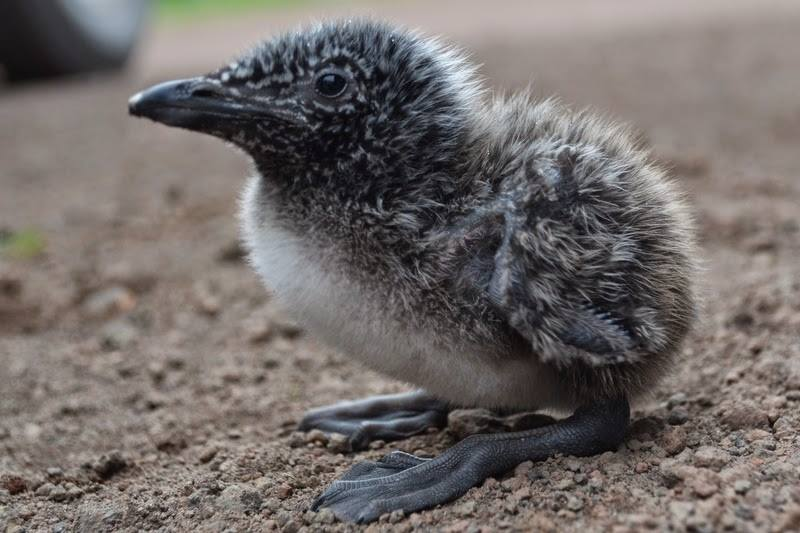
Chick, Alaska

The chicks will leave the nest after 16 to 30 days (average 20–22 days), and glide down into the sea, slowing their fall by fluttering as they are not yet able to fly. Chicks glide from heights as high as 457 m (1,499 ft) to the water below. Once the young chick has left the nest, the male is in close attendance for up to two months. The chicks are able to fly roughly two weeks after fledging. Up until then the male feeds and cares for the chick at sea. In its migration south the chick swims about 1,000 km (600 mi). The female remains at the nest site for up to 36 days after the chick has fledged (average 16 days).

== Relationship with humans ==
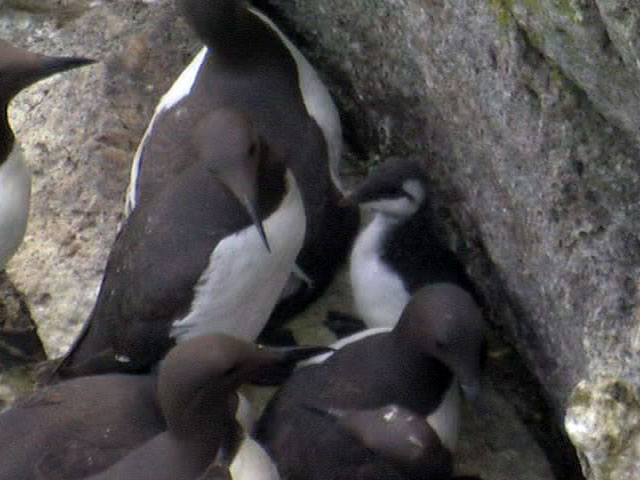
Common murre chick, Lundy

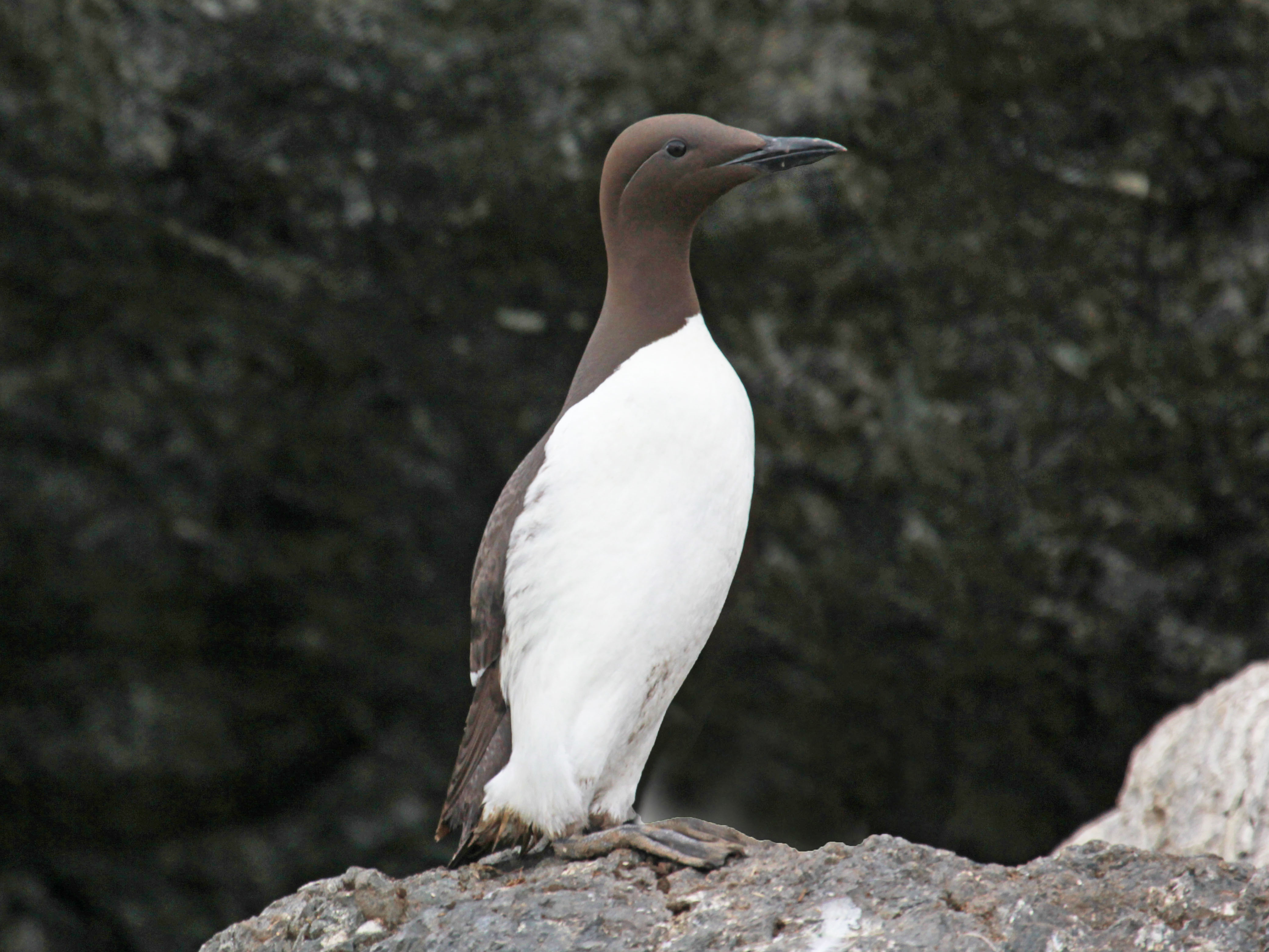
Breeding plumage

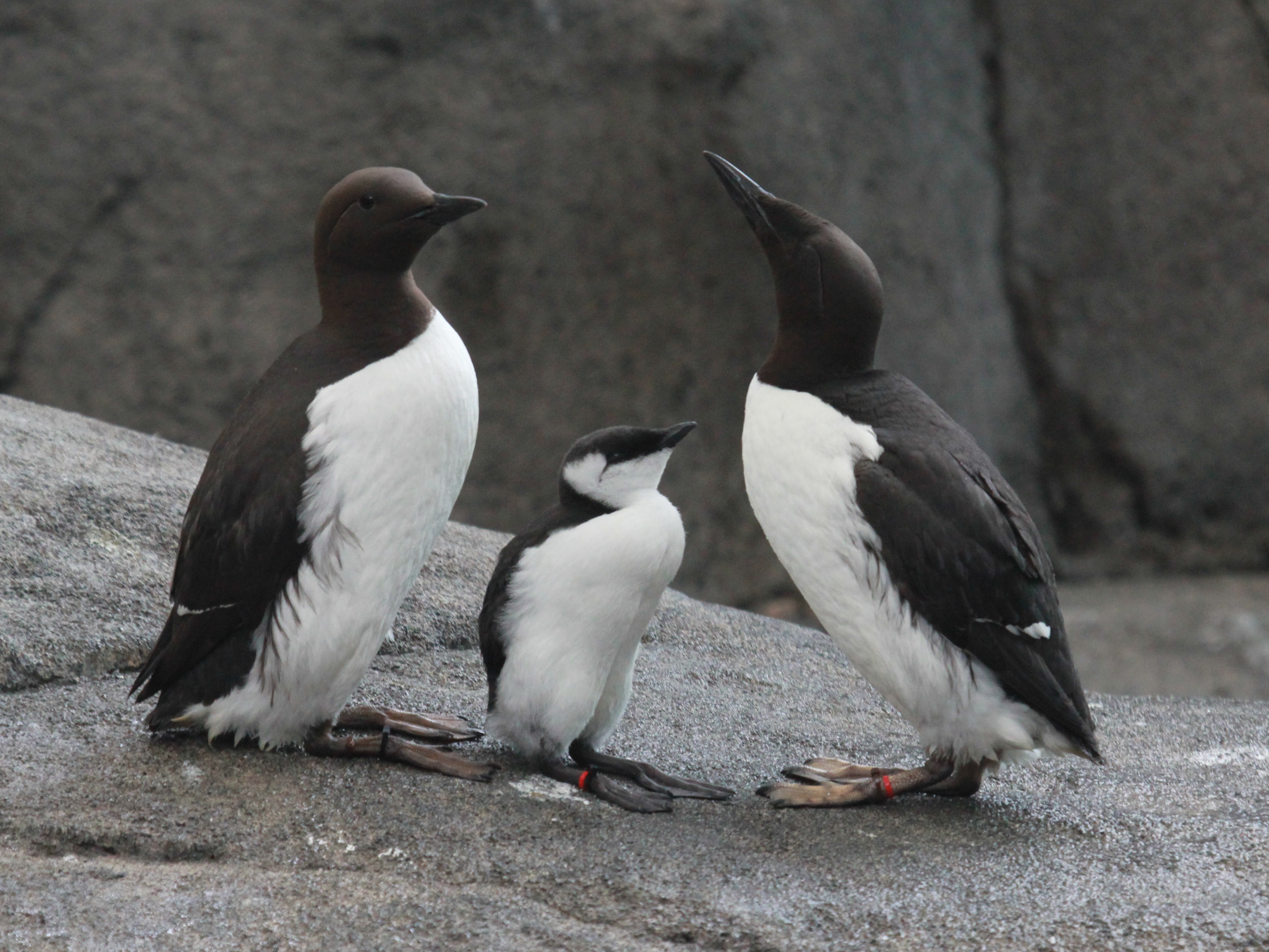
Common murre family

=== Pollution ===
Major oil spills double the winter mortality of breeding adults but appear to have little effect on birds less than three years old. This loss of breeding birds can be compensated by increased recruitment of 4–6 year olds to breeding colonies.

=== Recreational disturbance ===
Nesting common murres are prone to two main sources of recreational disturbance: rock-climbing and birdwatching. Sea cliffs are a paradise for climbers as well as birds; a small island like Lundy has over 1000 described climbing routes. To minimise disturbance, some cliffs are subject to seasonal climbing bans.

Birdwatching has conflicting effects on common murres. Birdwatchers petitioned the UK government to introduce the Sea Birds Preservation Act 1869. This act was designed to reduce the effects of shooting and egg collecting during the breeding season. Current concerns include managing the effect of visitor numbers at wildlife reserves. Common murres have been shown to be sensitive to visitor numbers.

=== Seabirds as indicators of marine health ===
When common murres are feeding their young, they return with one fish at a time. The provisioning time relates to the distance of the feeding areas from the colony and the numbers of available fish. There is a strong non-linear relationship between fish density and colony attendance during chick-rearing.

=== As a food source ===
In areas such as Newfoundland and Labrador, the birds, along with the related thick-billed murre, are referred to as 'turrs' or 'tuirs', and are eaten. The meat is dark and quite oily, due to the birds' diet of fish. Eggs have also been harvested. Eggers from San Francisco took almost half a million eggs a year from the Farallon Islands in the mid-19th century to feed the growing city.

=== Mass mortality in global warming ===
A 2024 study in the journal Science has reported that an extreme marine heatwave has killed approximately half of Alaska's common murre. Between the 7-year period before (2008–2014) and after (2016–2022) the heatwave, murre numbers plummeted 52 to 78% at 13 colonies, lost 4 million common murres, which is the largest-documented wildlife mortality event in the modern era. No evidence of recovery has yet been observed.
