= Guillemot =

Species of seabird

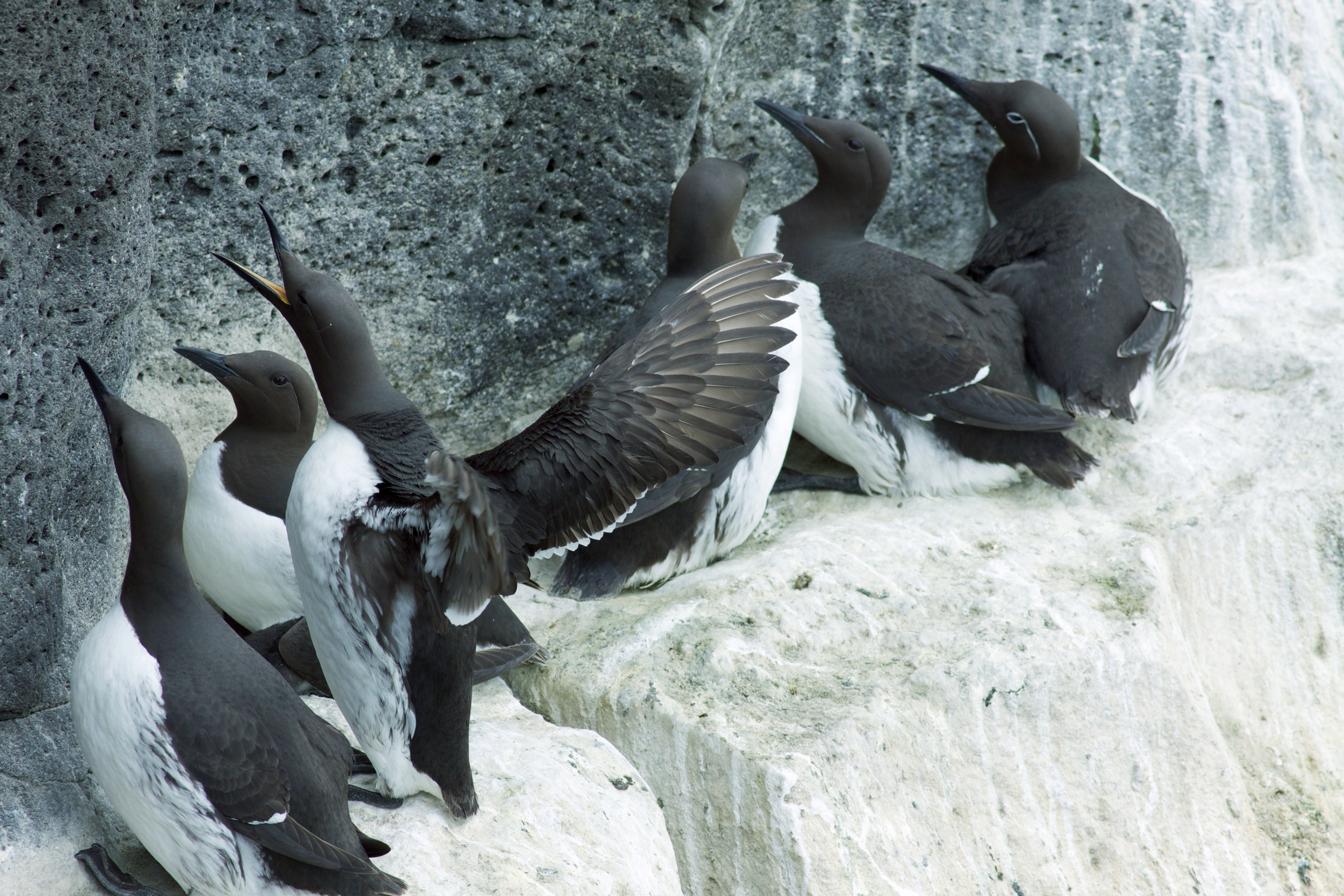
Common guillemots, one in bridled form (with "spectacles"), and one Brünnich's guillemot (U. lomvia, with white-marked bills) from the genus Uria

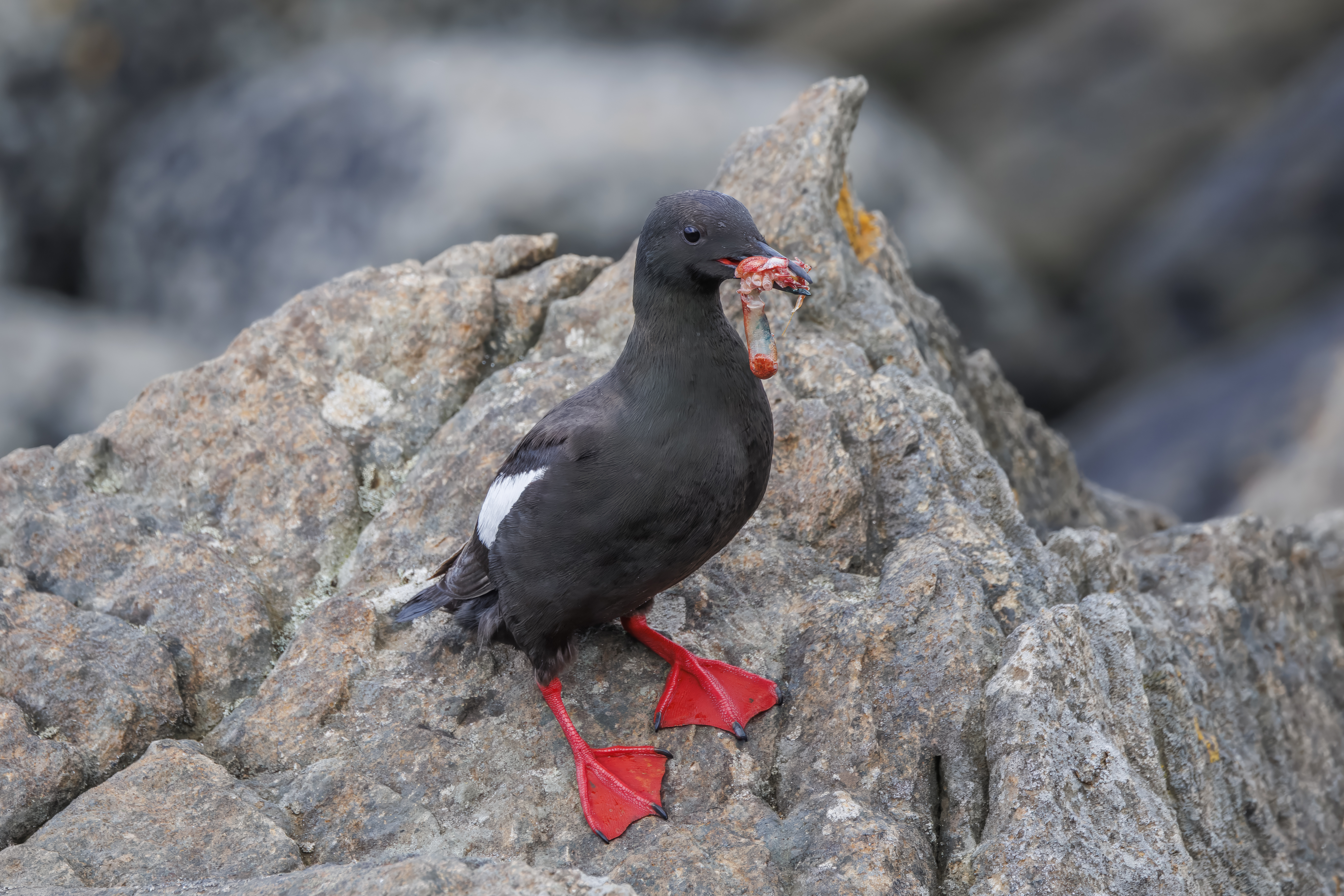
Black guillemot (C. grylle icelandicus)

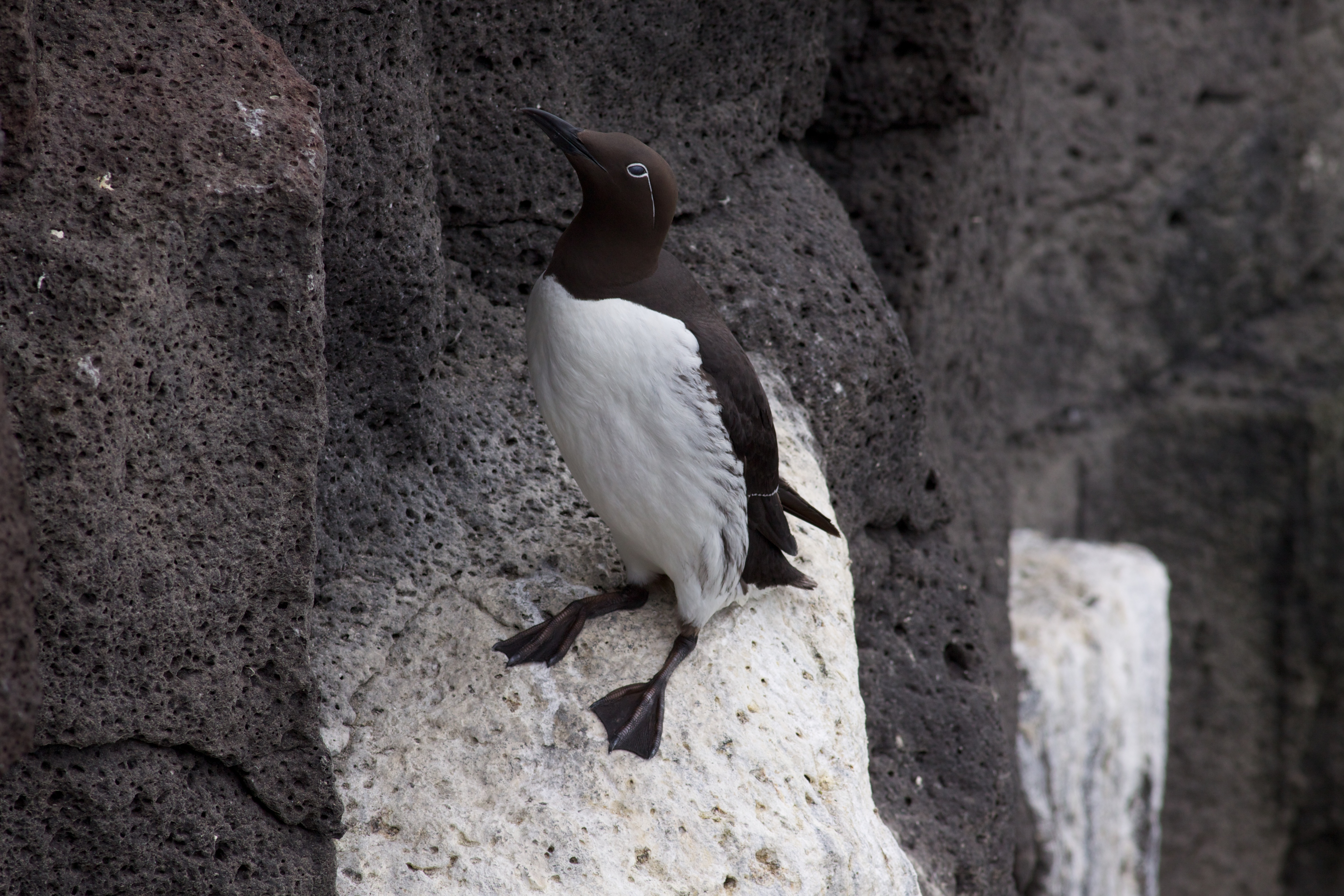
Common guillemot in bridled form, a white circle around the eye with an extension backwards suggesting they are wearing spectacles

Guillemot (English: /ˈɡɪləˌmɒt/ GILL-ə-mot, French: [gij(ə)mo]) is the common name for several species of seabird in the Alcidae or auk family, part of the order Charadriiformes. In Europe, the term covers two genera, Uria and Cepphus. In North America the Uria species are called murres and only the Cepphus species are called "guillemots".

The two living species of Uria, together with the razorbill, little auk, and the extinct great auk, make up the tribe Alcini. They have distinctly white bellies, thicker and longer bills than Cepphus, and form very dense colonies on cliffs during the reproductive season. Guillemot eggs are large (around 11% of female weight), pyriform (pear-shaped), and colourful, making them attractive targets for egg collectors.

The three living species of Cepphus form a tribe of their own, Cepphini. They are smaller than the Uria species and have black bellies in breeding plumage, rounder heads and bright red feet.

== Etymology ==
The current spelling guillemot is of French origin (pronounced [gij(ə)mo]), first attested by Pierre Belon in 1555, but derived from Old (11th century) French willelm, and matched by English variants willock (attested 1631), willick, will and wilkie, all from forms of the name William, cf. French Guillaume (pronounced [gijom]), but ultimately onomatopoeic from the loud, high-pitched "will, willem" begging calls of the newly fledged young of the common guillemot. The American name murre, also known from England (particularly Cornwall) from the 17th century, is by contrast, onomatopoeic of the growling call of adult common guillemots.

== Systematics ==
=== Uria ===
- Common murre or common guillemot, Uria aalge
- Thick-billed murre or Brünnich's guillemot, Uria lomvia

Some prehistoric species are also known:

- Uria brodkorbi (Monterey or Sisquoc Late Miocene of Lompoc, USA)
- Uria affinis (Late Pleistocene of E USA)—possibly a subspecies of U. lomvia
- Uria paleohesperis

Uria brodkorbi is the only known occurrence of the Alcini tribe in the temperate to subtropical Pacific, except for the very fringe of the range of U. aalge.

=== Cepphus ===
- Black guillemot or tystie, Cepphus grylle
- Pigeon guillemot, Cepphus columba
- Spectacled guillemot, Cepphus carbo

As in other genera of auks, fossils of prehistoric forms of Cepphus have been found:

- Cepphus olsoni (San Luis Rey River Late Miocene—Early Pliocene of W USA)
- Cepphus cf. columba (Lawrence Canyon Early Pliocene of W USA)
- Cepphus cf. grylle (San Diego Late Pliocene, W USA)

The latter two resemble the extant species, but because of the considerable distance in time or space from their current occurrence, they may represent distinct species.

== Pyriform egg ==
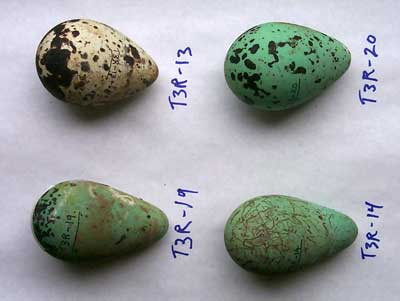
Eggs of the common murre (Uria aalge)

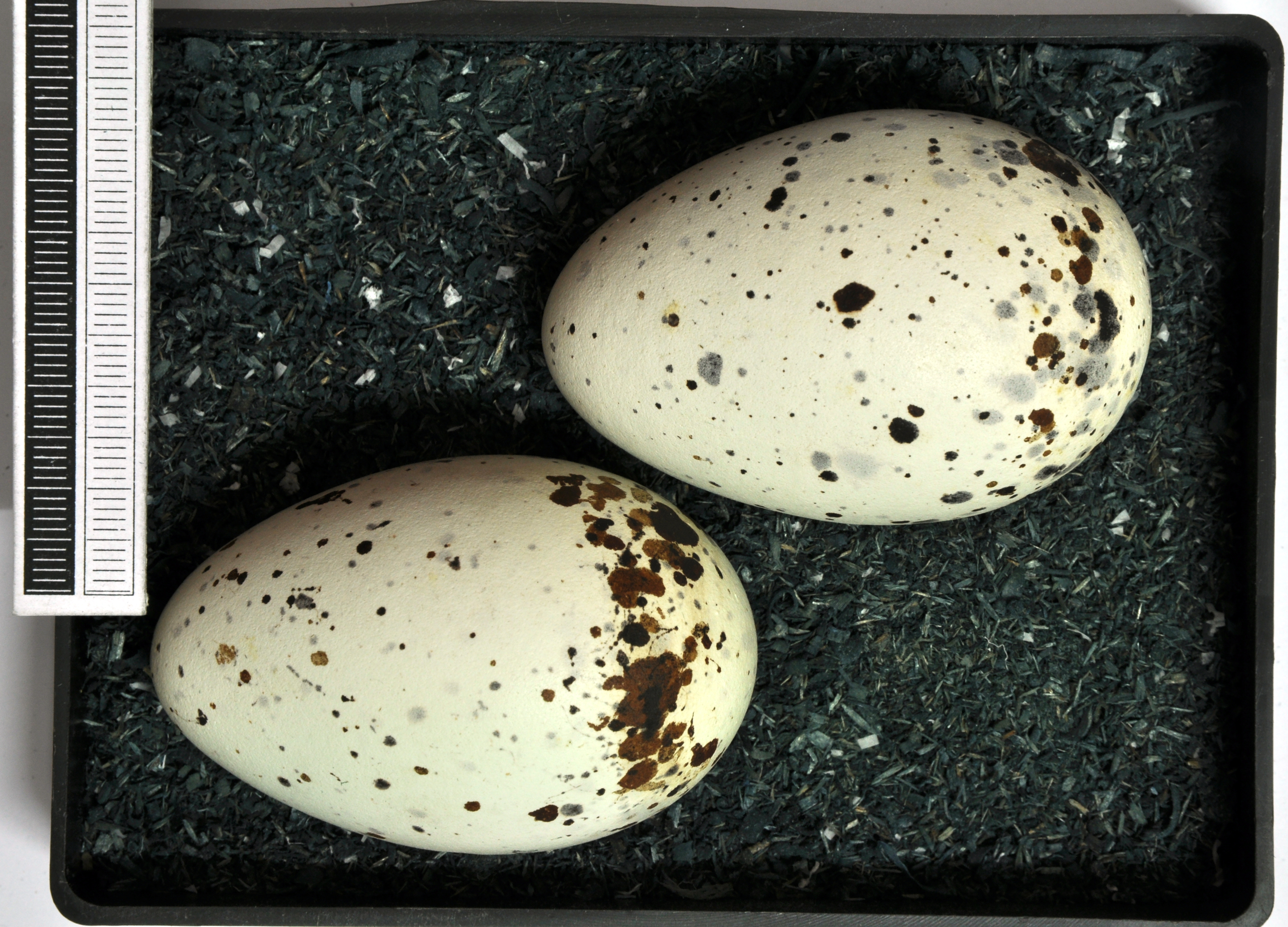
Eggs of the black guillemot (Cepphus grylle)

Guillemots lay a single pyriform (pear-shaped) egg directly on a cliff edge in dense breeding colonies; they do not build a nest, allowing them to nest close to one another even on uneven cliff edges, the density protecting their eggs and chicks from predatory gulls. While the egg would seem vulnerable to rolling off the edge, this does not usually happen. It has been suggested that the egg might simply spin if disturbed, or roll in an arc preventing it from falling over the cliff edge. There is no evidence for either explanation. However, a pyriform egg placed experimentally on a steep slope did not roll, while a less pointed and more ellipsoidal egg did. Ornithologist Tim Birkhead experimented, and found that the arc that a pyriform egg rolls in is wider than most cliff ledges, so not protective against falls. He attributed the egg's stability to its long straight edge resting on the ground, creating more friction and making it less likely to move and fall.

Guillemot eggs were collected until the late 1920s in Scotland's St Kilda islands by their men scaling the cliffs. The eggs were buried in St Kilda peat ash to be eaten through the cold, northern winters. The eggs were considered to be similar to duck eggs in taste and nutrition.

== Bounciness in chicks ==
Guillemot chicks are born on rocky cliffs near the seaside. They leave the nest by jumping off the cliffsides before their wings are strong enough to allow them to fly, so they parachute down toward the ground as opposed to flying. Their dense, downy feathers and underdeveloped wings allow them to avoid serious harm when falling to the ground, so they bounce around slightly after hitting the ground.
