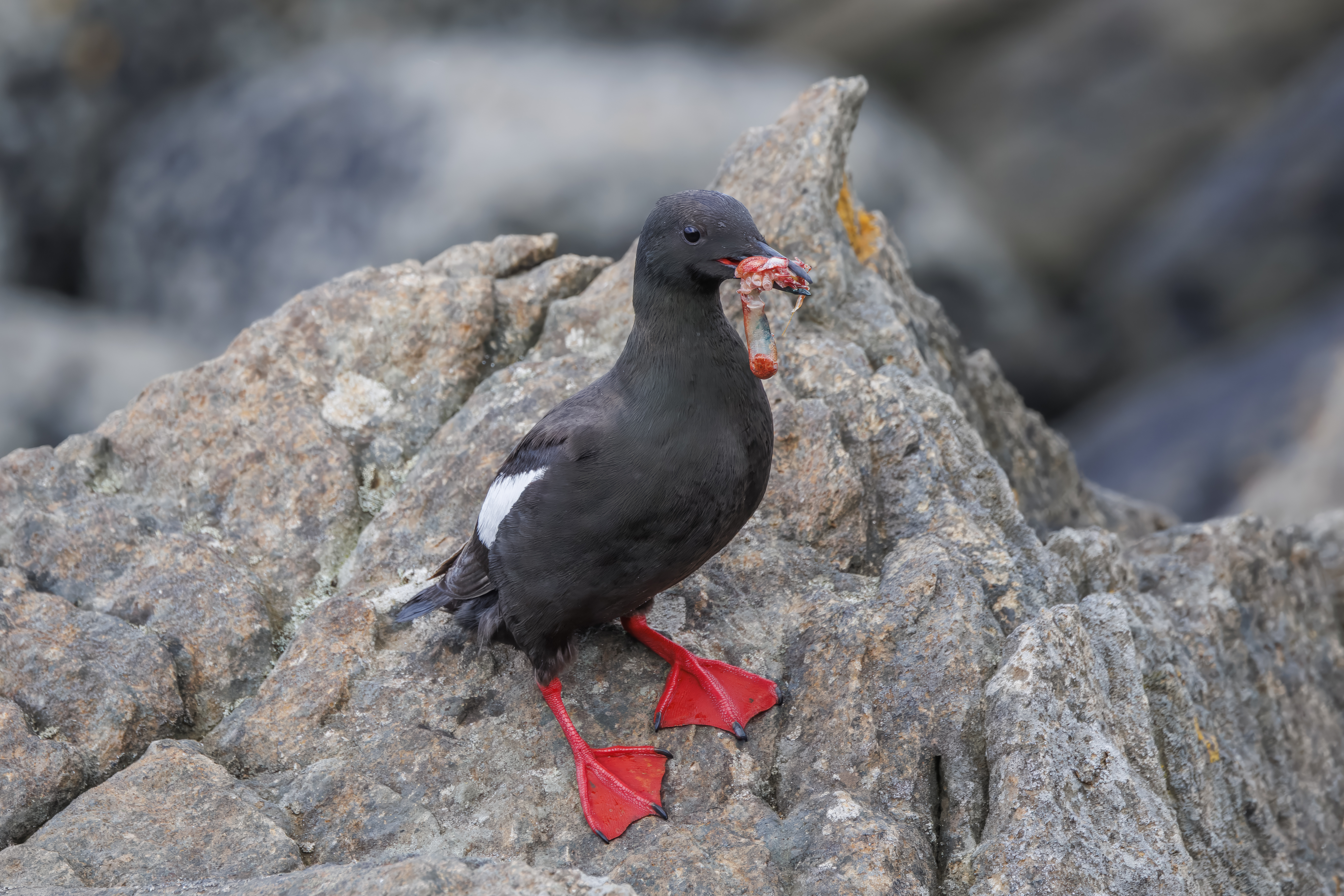
- Cepphus grylle islandicus with hermit crab (Pagurus bernhardus), on Flatey island, Iceland

Conservation status
- Least Concern (IUCN 3.1)

Scientific classification
- Kingdom: Animalia
- Phylum: Chordata
- Class: Aves
- Order: Charadriiformes
- Family: Alcidae
- Genus: Cepphus
- Species: C. grylle

Binomial name
- Cepphus grylle (Linnaeus, 1758)

Synonyms
- Alca grylle Linnaeus, 1758; Colymbus grylle Linnaeus, 1766

= Black guillemot =

Species of bird

The black guillemot or tystie (Cepphus grylle), is a medium-sized seabird of the Alcidae family. It is found across northern Europe, the North Atlantic and parts of the Arctic, including the coasts of Canada, Greenland, Iceland, the British Isles, Scandinavia and Russia. It inhabits marine environments, including coastal and intertidal waters as well as offshore ocean habitats. The bird is resident in much of its range, but large populations from the high arctic migrate southwards in winter. The bird can be seen in and around its breeding habitat of rocky shores, cliffs and islands in single or small groups of pairs. They feed mainly by diving towards the sea floor feeding on fish, crustaceans or other benthic invertebrates. They are listed on the IUCN red list as a species of least concern.

In breeding plumage, the black guillemot is predominantly black, with oval white wing patches and bright red legs. In autumn and winter, its plumage becomes largely off-white with dark markings, a darker back and dark flight feathers. Both sexes have very similar appearances. The bill is also black, being rather long and slender, while the feet are coral-red. In winter adult underparts are white and the upperparts are a pale grey with the back and shoulders exhibiting barred light grey and white patterning.

The birds breed in solitary pairs or small groups during their breeding season starting in late February and early May. Pairs nest above the high tide mark, usually in cliff crevices or gaps in boulders. Breeding pairs typically lay clutches of one or two eggs, and raise 2 chicks to fledging. Many pairs lack true nests and lay directly on the ground. The eggs are dull white to pale green, boldly marked with dark spots and blotches. Incubation by both parents typically lasts 28 to 32 days. Once hatched, chicks are covered with black down and receive care from the parents until they fledge aged 30–40 days, unaccompanied by their parents. Once fledged, chicks are totally independent and by age three or four years they will begin to re-join their natal colony.

== Taxonomy ==
The black guillemot was formally described in 1758 by the Swedish naturalist Carl Linnaeus in the tenth edition of his Systema Naturae. He placed it with the other auks in the genus Alca and coined the binomial name Alca grylle. Linnaeus specified the type locality as the Ocean of northern Europe but this has subsequently been restricted to Sweden. The black guillemot is now one of three species placed in the genus Cepphus that was introduced in 1769 by the Prussian naturalist Peter Pallas. The genus name Cepphus is from Ancient Greek kepphos, a pale waterbird mentioned by Greek authors including Aristotle. The species name grylle was the local dialect name for this bird in Gotland at the time of Linnaeus's visit there in 1741. The English word "guillemot" is from French guillemot probably derived from Guillaume, "William", but ultimately onomatopoeic from the loud, high-pitched "will, willem" begging calls of the newly fledged young of the common guillemot.

Five subspecies are recognised:

- Cepphus grylle mandtii (Lichtenstein, MHC, 1822) – high Arctic coasts: west, east Greenland, Jan Mayen (northeast of Iceland), Svalbard (north of Norway), north Siberia and north Alaska, northeast Canada to north Labrador
- Cepphus grylle arcticus (Brehm, CL, 1824) – low Arctic to north temperate coasts: south Greenland, northwest British Isles, south Scandinavia, and the White Sea (northwest Russia), south Labrador and Newfoundland (southeast Canada) and Gulf of Maine
- Cepphus grylle islandicus Hørring, 1937 – coastal Iceland
- Cepphus grylle faeroeensis Brehm, CL, 1831 – Faroe Islands
- Cepphus grylle grylle (Linnaeus, 1758) – coastal Baltic Sea

== Description ==
The black guillemot is a medium-sized bird with adults normally 30 to 32 centimetres (12 to 12 1/2 inches) in length and with wingspans of 52 to 58 cm (20 1/2 to 23 in). The bodyweight can range from 300 to 460 grams (10 1/2 to 16 ounces). Adults have both summer and winter plumage and there is no sexual difference in this that can be identified in the field. The English common name "Black Guillemot" references their strikingly black breeding summer plumage which is totally black except for a large white patch on the upper side of their wings. During the summer plumage, their legs, feet and inside of the mouth are all a bright coral-red, and their beak is black. Adults lose their summer plumage in an early fall moult where their upper plumage become barred with light grey and white, their head is a pale grey, their underparts white, and legs and feet a pale red. They retain their white wing patch, black beak and red inside their mouth. The call in the breeding season is a high whistle. The red gape is also prominent then.

Juveniles and immatures can easily be identified by the spotting of the white wing patch with grey or brown feathers and is easy to see even at far distances in the field.

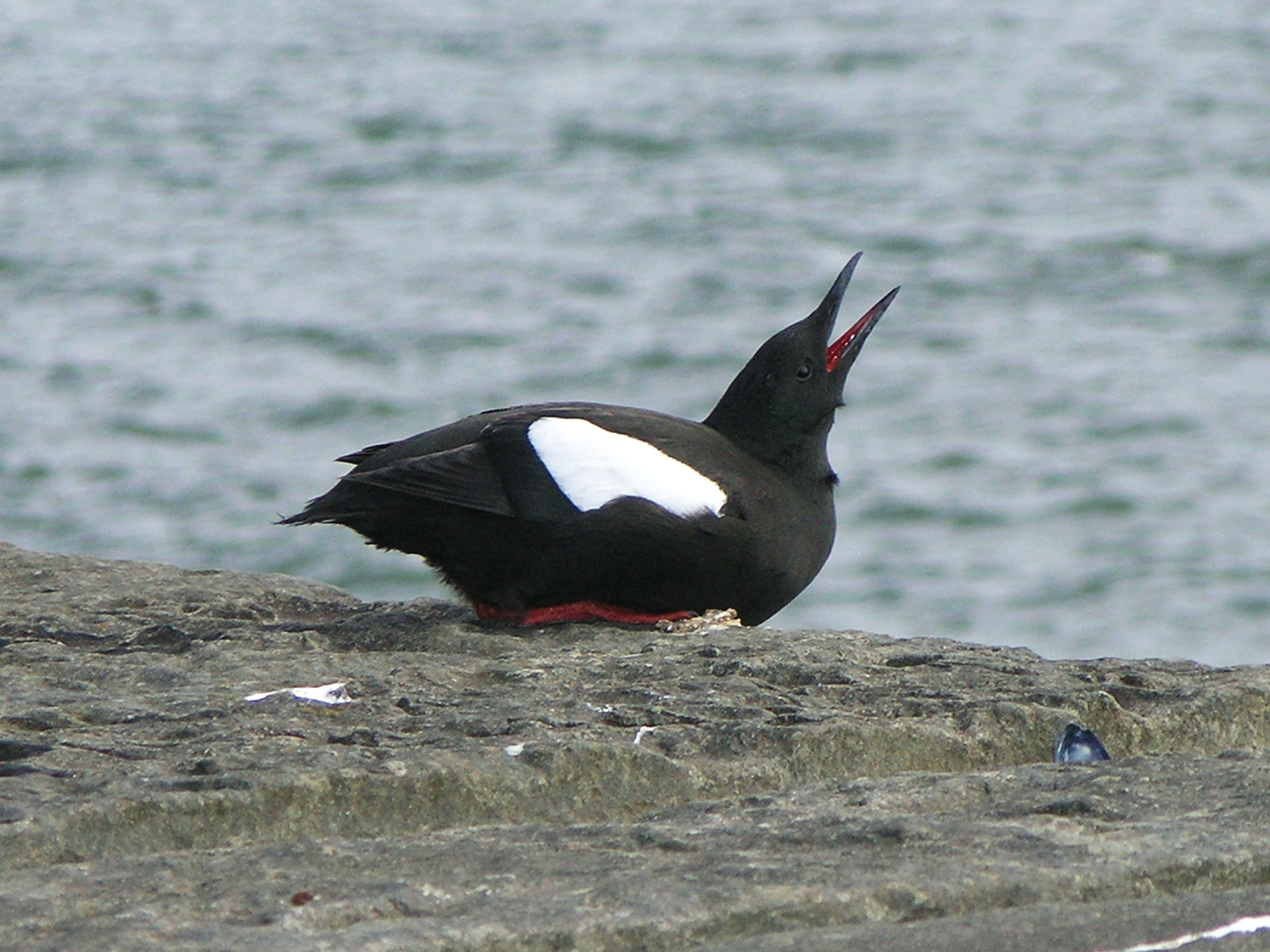
Showing red gape

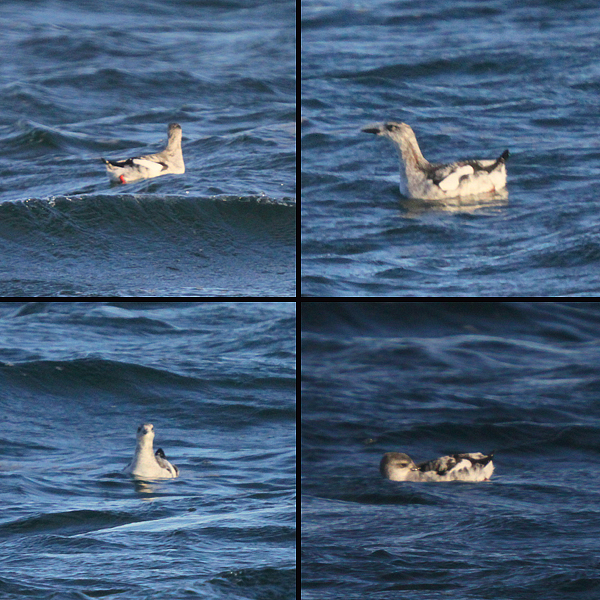
Winter plumage off the coast of Maine

== Distribution and habitat ==
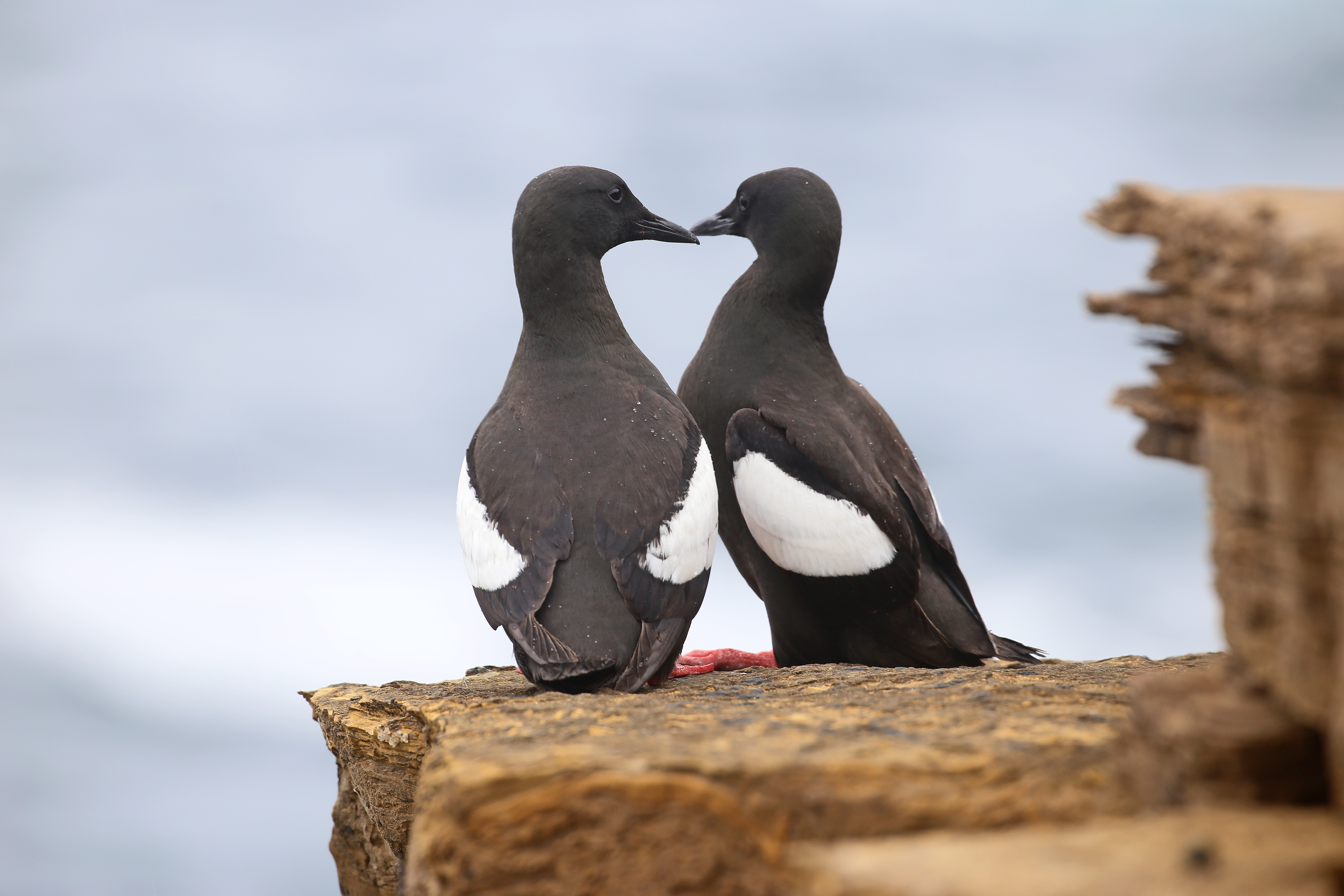
Black guillemots in summer plumage. July 2018, Yesnaby, Orkney

The black guillemot is a circumpolar species distributed in the boreal, low arctic and high arctic regions of the north Atlantic and arctic oceans and breeding between 43° and 82°N. The 5 listed subspecies inhabit different parts of this range. In North America, they can be found as far south as the Gulf of Maine and New England and across parts of the northern coast of North America as far as Alaska, where they are replaced by the pigeon guillemot in the North Pacific. In Europe and Asia, they are found from the British Isles and Northward across the northern coast of Asia. They are one of the few birds to breed on Surtsey, Iceland, a new volcanic island. It is a fairly common breeding bird around the coast of Ireland, and in western and northern Scotland. In the remainder of Britain, they only breed at St. Bees Head in Cumbria, the Isle of Man and on east Anglesey in north Wales. Approximately 40% of the population breeds in the high arctic where the largest colonies are found, 30% in the low arctic, and 30% in boreal waters. In the winter, some of the birds in the high arctic waters are forced south by the winter ice making them seasonal migrants, but in more temperate zones the species is essentially resident.

Typically restricted to rocky shores, black guillemots utilize the cliffs, crevices and boulders for their nests, hunting the inshore waters for benthic prey. Compared to other auks, they forage fairly close to the colony, in the breeding season mostly in inshore waters less than 50m in depth, farther afield in the winter months.

== Behaviour ==
One of the early ornithologists that described aspects of the behaviour of the black guillemot was Edmund Selous (1857–1934) in his book The Bird Watcher in the Shetlands (1905). In the chapter titled 'From the Edge of a Precipice' he writes for instance that sometimes the black guillemots carry a fish they have caught in their beak for hours. He also gives further details about the behaviour.

Black guillemots are coastal foragers with diets typically associated with benthic and kelp-forest prey. They dive between 15–20 m (49–66 ft) to catch their prey, but can dive to a depth of at least 43 m (141 ft). They use their wings to propel themselves forward and their feet to steer. Small prey are swallowed underwater whole. Guillemots bring larger prey to the surface to soften in their bill before swallowing whole. Guillemots are single-prey loaders, meaning they bring single prey items back to their chicks during the chick-rearing period. This limits the spatial range that parents can forage for food, as chicks must receive a high number of energy-rich prey items throughout each day. Black guillemot diets include sculpins, butterfish, rock gunnel, northern sandlance, herring, jellyfish, mollusks, and small crustaceans.

== Threats ==
A number of threats face black guillemots. They have been shown to be vulnerable to several species of predators including the American mink, great skua, gulls, and the Eurasian otter (Lutra lutra), as well as introduced species like the brown rat and feral cats. One large colony on an island in the Baltic Sea (approximately 2600 individuals) was wiped out by American Mink in the early 2000s. Because black guillemots forage close to shore, they tend to be exposed to more pollution than further oceangoing seabirds. Additional sources of pressure include fisheries bycatch, habitat destruction, and climate change.
