= Pigeon guillemot =

- C. c. adiantus, hock sitting, Tofino, BC, Canada

Conservation status
- Least Concern (IUCN 3.1)

Scientific classification
- Kingdom: Animalia
- Phylum: Chordata
- Class: Aves
- Order: Charadriiformes
- Family: Alcidae
- Genus: Cepphus
- Species: C. columba

Binomial name
- Cepphus columba Pallas, 1811
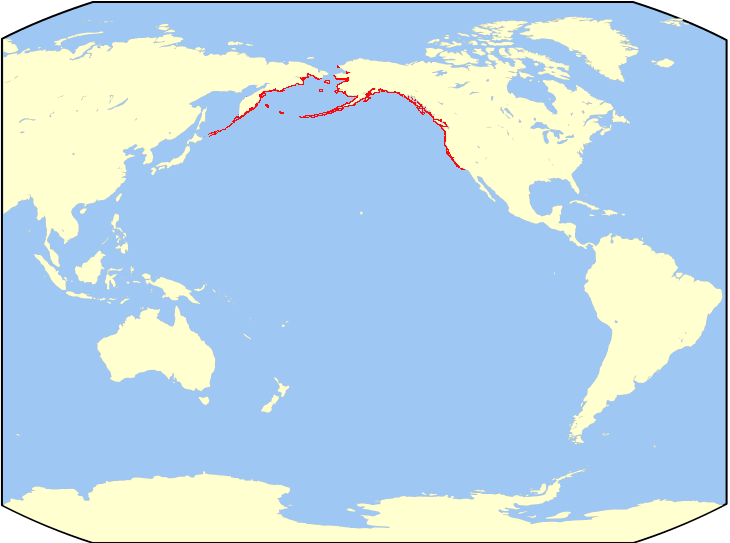
- Range

Seabird in the auk family from North Pacific coastal waters

The pigeon guillemot (Cepphus columba) (/ˈɡɪlɪmɒt/) is a species of bird in the auk family, Alcidae. One of three species in the genus Cepphus, it is most closely related to the spectacled guillemot. There are five subspecies of the pigeon guillemot; all subspecies, when in breeding plumage, are dark brown with a black iridescent sheen and a distinctive wing patch broken by a brown-black wedge. Its non-breeding plumage has mottled grey and black upperparts and white underparts. The long bill is black, as are the claws. The legs, feet, and inside of the mouth are red. It closely resembles the black guillemot, which is slightly smaller and lacks the dark wing wedge present in the pigeon guillemot.

This seabird is found on North Pacific coastal waters, from Siberia through Alaska to California. The pigeon guillemot breeds and sometimes roosts on rocky shores, cliffs, and islands close to shallow water. In the winter, some birds move slightly south in the northernmost part of their range in response to advancing ice and migrate slightly north in the southern part of their range, generally preferring more sheltered areas.

This species feeds on small fish and marine invertebrates, mostly near the sea floor, that it catches by pursuit diving. Pigeon guillemots are monogamous breeders, nesting in small colonies close to the shore. They defend small territories around a nesting cavity, in which they lay one or two eggs. Both parents incubate the eggs and feed the chicks. After leaving the nest the young bird is completely independent of its parents. Several birds and other animals prey on the eggs and chicks.

The pigeon guillemot is considered to be a least concern species by the International Union for Conservation of Nature due to its large, stable population and wide range. Threats to this bird include climate change, introduced mammalian predators, and oil spills.

== Taxonomy and nomenclature ==
The pigeon guillemot is one of three species of auk in the genus Cepphus, the other two being the black guillemot of the Atlantic Ocean and the spectacled guillemot from the Western Pacific. It was described in 1811 by Peter Simon Pallas in the second volume of his Zoographia Rosso-Asiatica. A 1996 study looking at the mitochondrial DNA of the auk family found that the genus Cepphus is most closely related to the murrelets from the genus Synthliboramphus. An alternative arrangement, proposed in 2001 using genetic and morphological comparisons, found them as a sister clade to the murres, razorbill, little auk and great auk. Within the genus, the pigeon guillemot and spectacled guillemot are sister species, and the black guillemot is basal within the genus. The pigeon guillemot and the black guillemot form a superspecies. (Note: A superspecies is a classification based on physical description, whereas a sister species is a phylogenetic description.)

- - Synthliboramphus
  - Cepphus
    - Black guillemot
    - - Pigeon guillemot
      - Spectacled guillemot

Cladogram showing the relationship of the pigeon guillemot. Based on Friesen (1996).

There are five recognised subspecies of the pigeon guillemot:

- Cepphus columba columba Pallas, 1811 – northeast Siberia through the Bering Sea
- C. c. snowi (Stejneger, 1897) – northern & central Kuril Islands
- C. c. kaiurka (Portenko, 1937) – Commander Islands to west-central Aleutian Islands
- C. c. adiantus (Storer, 1950) – central Aleutian Islands to Washington
- C. c. eureka (Storer, 1950) – Oregon & California

In the binomial name, the genus, Cepphus, is derived from the Greek kepphos, referring to an unknown pale waterbird mentioned by Aristotle among other classical writers, later variously identified as types of seabirds, including gulls, auks and gannets. The specific epithet, columba, is derived both from the Icelandic klumba, meaning "auk", and the Latin columba, meaning "pigeon". Pallas noted in his description of this species that the common name for the related black guillemot was Greenland dove. Snowi is dedicated to Captain Henry James Snow, a British seaman and hunter. The name of the subspecies kaiurka is derived from the Russian kachurka, meaning "petrel". Adiantus is derived from the Greek adiantos, "unwetted". The trinomial epithet of the subspecies C. c. eureka is from the motto of the state of California, which is derived from the Greek heurēka, meaning "I have found it".

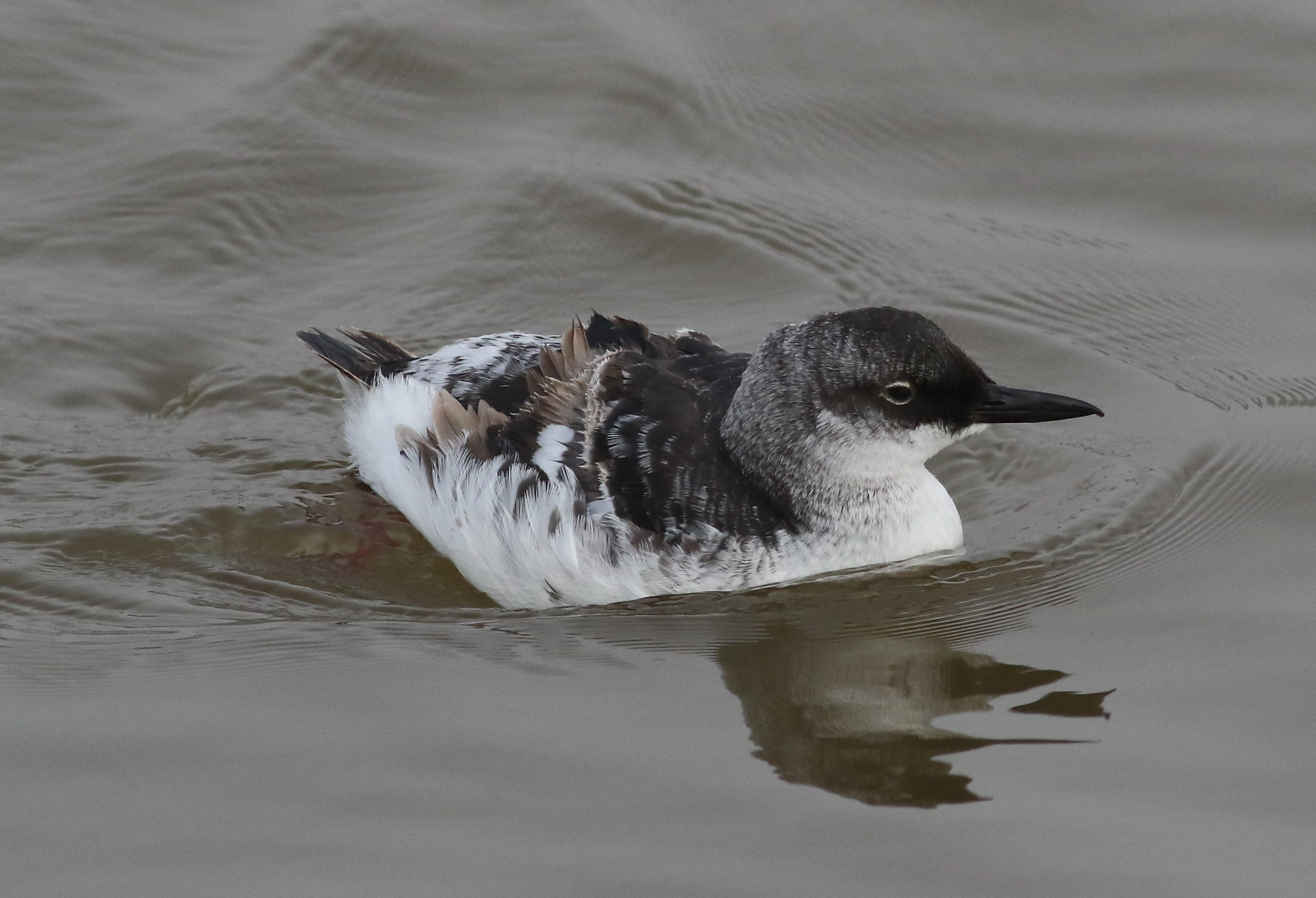
C. c. eureka winter plumage
Moss Landing, California

C. c. adiantus summer plumage
Vancouver Island, BC

C. c. adiantus summer plumage
Vancouver Island, BC

== Description ==
The pigeon guillemot is a medium-sized auk, 30 to 37 cm (12 to 15 in) in length and weighing 450 to 550 g (16 to 19 oz). Both sexes are alike in appearance and mass, except for Californian birds where females were found to have larger bills than males. The summer or breeding plumage of the adult is mostly dark brown with a black sheen, with a white wing patch broken by a brown-black wedge. In winter, the upperparts are iridescent black, often with black fringes giving a scalloped appearance, and the underparts and rump are white. The forehead, crown, lores, eye line and ear coverts are black with white tips, sometimes the tips are narrow and the head looks black. In all plumages, the underwings are plain and dark. Adults moult into their winter or non-breeding plumage between August and October, taking around a month to complete and leaving the bird unable to fly for around four weeks. Birds moult into their breeding plumage between January and March. The legs and feet are red, with black claws. The iris is brown and the eye is surrounded by a thin unbroken white eye-ring. The bill is long and black and the inside of the mouth is red.

The juvenile pigeon guillemot resembles a winter adult but has underpart feathers tipped in brown, giving the appearance of barring, more brown feathers in the upperparts and its wing patch is smaller. Its legs are a grey-brown in color. It loses the brown underpart feathers after its first moult two to three months after fledging. Its moult to its first summer plumage is later than adults, happening between March and May, and first summer birds lack the glossy sheen of adults.

The differences between the subspecies are based on body measurements such as the culmen and wing length. These are larger in southern subspecies and smaller further north. The amount of white on the outer primaries and underwing coverts increases in northern subspecies, except for Cepphus columba snowi, where the white is reduced or entirely absent.

The pigeon guillemot walks well and habitually has an upright posture. When sitting it frequently rests on its tarsi. The wings of the pigeon guillemot are shorter and rounder than other auks, reflecting greater adaptation towards diving than flying. It has difficulty taking off in calm conditions without a runway, but once in the air it is faster than the black guillemot, having been recorded at 77 km/h (48 mph), about 20 km/h (12 mph) faster than the black guillemot. In the water it is a strong swimmer on the surface using its feet. When diving, propulsion is provided both by the wings, which beat at a rate of 2.1/s, but unusually for auks also by the feet. Pigeon guillemots have been recorded travelling 75 m (246 ft) horizontally on dives.

The pigeon guillemot is similar to the related black guillemot, but can be distinguished by its larger size, and in the breeding season by its dusky-grey underwing and the dark brown wedge on the white wing patch.

== Distribution and habitat ==
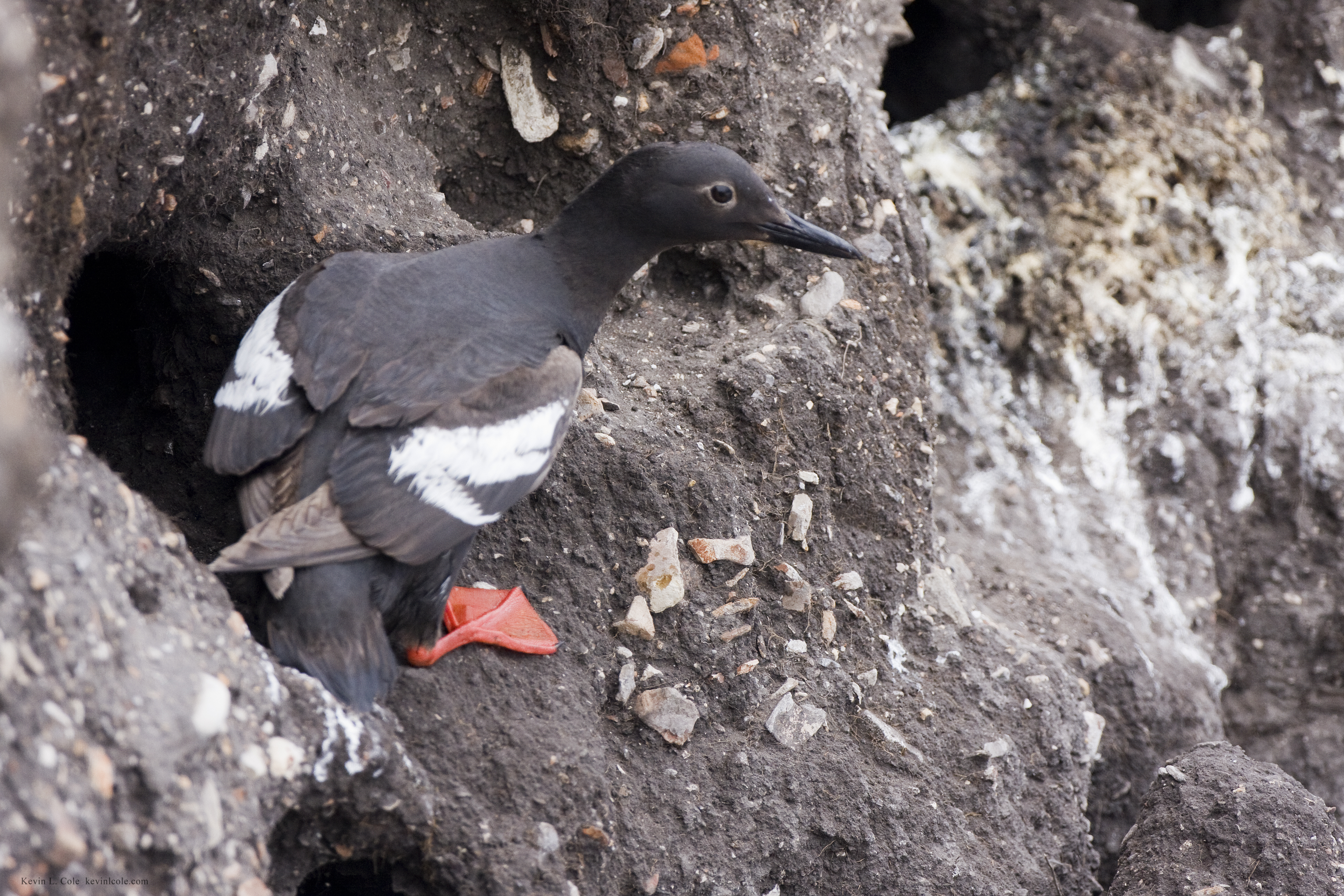
At cliffside nest

The pigeon guillemot ranges across the Northern Pacific, from the Kuril Islands and the Kamchatka Peninsula in Siberia to coasts in western North America from Alaska to California. This bird's wintering range is more restricted than its breeding season range, the pigeon guillemot usually wintering at sea or on the coasts, from the Pribilof and Aleutian Islands to Hokkaido and southern California. In Alaska, some migrate south because of advancing sea-ice, although others remain in ice leads or ice holes some distance from the edge of the ice sheet. Further south, birds banded in the Farallon Islands in central California have been recorded moving north, as far as Oregon and even British Columbia. It generally is philopatric, meaning it returns to the colony where it hatched to breed, but it sometimes moves long distances after fledging before settling, for example a chick ringed in the Farallones was recorded breeding in British Columbia.

This bird's breeding habitats are rocky shores, cliffs, and islands close to shallow water less than 50 m (160 ft) deep. It is flexible about its breeding site location, the important factor being protection from predators, and it is more commonly found breeding on offshore islands than coastal sea cliffs. In the winter it forages along rocky coasts, often in sheltered coves. Sandy-bottomed water is avoided, presumably because this does not provide the right habitat to feed in. It occasionally can be found further offshore, as far as the continental shelf break. In the Bering Sea and Alaska, it feeds in openings in ice sheets.

== Behaviour ==
Pigeon guillemots are generally diurnal, but have been recorded feeding before dawn and after sunset. They typically sleep in loose groups in sheltered waters or on shore close to water. They typically rest spaced apart, but mated pairs rest close together. Bathing and preening can also happen on shore or at sea.

=== Breeding ===
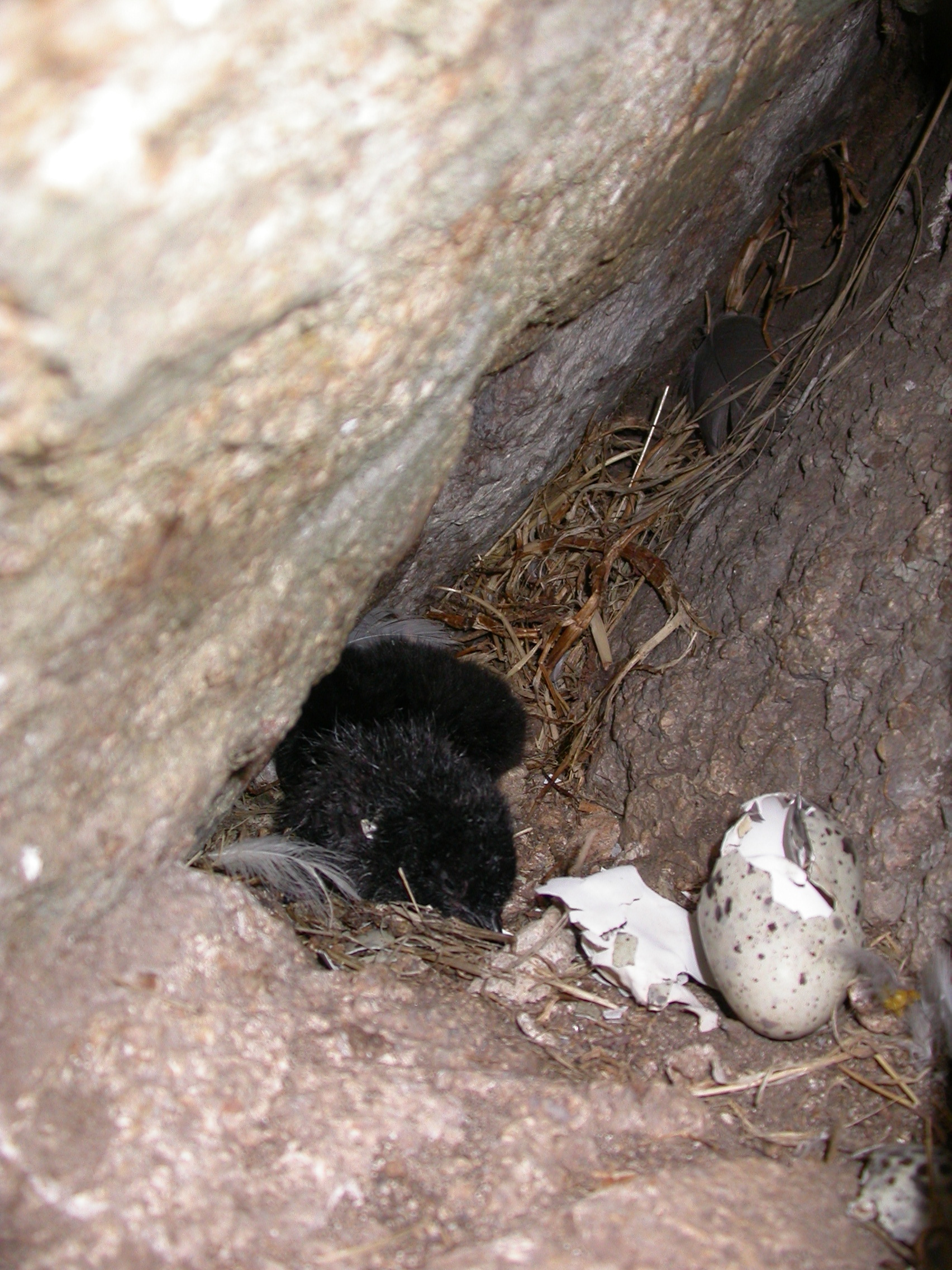
Two pigeon guillemot chicks, one just hatched, in a nesting crevice with eggshell remains.

The pigeon guillemot usually lays its eggs in rocky cavities near water, but it often nests in any available cavity, including caves, disused burrows of other seabirds, and even old bomb casings. It is noted that pigeon guillemots do not inhabit nests with gull eggs, specifically those of the western gull. This guillemot usually retains its nest site, meaning that nest sites are generally used multiple times, although it does not display this behaviour if its mate does not return to breed. The nests are found at a wide range of heights, from about 1 to 55 m (3.3 to 180.4 ft) above sea-level. Nesting sites are defended by established pairs, as is a small territory around the nest entrance of between 1–4 m^{2} (11–43 sq ft). Both sexes defend the nesting site, although most defence is done by the male.

Foreign eggs in this guillemot's nest are generally removed. Nest competition with Cassin's auklet is occasional, the pigeon guillemot almost always just removing the eggs, and rarely pithing before removal. On the other hand, larger auk species, tufted puffins and rhinoceros auklets, have been reported evicting pigeon guillemots from their nesting crevices.

This guillemot nests at a variety of densities, ranging from a single individual to dense colonies. The nesting density is generally not affected by predation, although on a very local scale, nesting closer to neighbors has a slight advantage. Colonies are attended during the day and, except for birds incubating or brooding, adults do not remain in the colony at night. Birds usually arrive in the colony in the morning, with counts decreasing after early afternoon, when high tide is. Colony attendance is affected by the tide, more appearing when the tide is higher and less when the tide is lower, probably because the prey this bird feeds on is more accessible during low tide, thus more birds are away from the colony. The counts vary the most before laying, while they are relatively stable during incubation and egg laying.

Pigeon guillemots form long-term pair bonds, the pairs usually reuniting each year, although occasionally pairs divorce. The formation of the pair bond is poorly understood. It is thought that form of play known as "water games", which involves chasing of birds on and under the water at sea, and duet-trilling may have a function in maintaining the pair bond or act as a prelude to copulation. The red colour of the mouth may also be a sexual signal.

Usually arriving at its breeding range 40 to 50 days before laying starts, the pigeon guillemot breeds from late April to September. During this time, it generally lays a clutch of one or two eggs. The eggs have grey and brown blotches near the larger end of the egg and range in colour from creamy to pale blue-green. They measure 61.2 mm × 41.0 mm (2.41 in × 1.61 in) on average, but become longer when laid later in the breeding season. Incubated by both sexes, the eggs usually hatch after 26 to 32 days. The chick is brooded continuously by both parents for three days, and then at intervals for another two to four days, after which it is able to control its own body temperature. Both parents are responsible for feeding the chicks, and bring single fish held in the bill throughout the day, but most frequently in the morning.

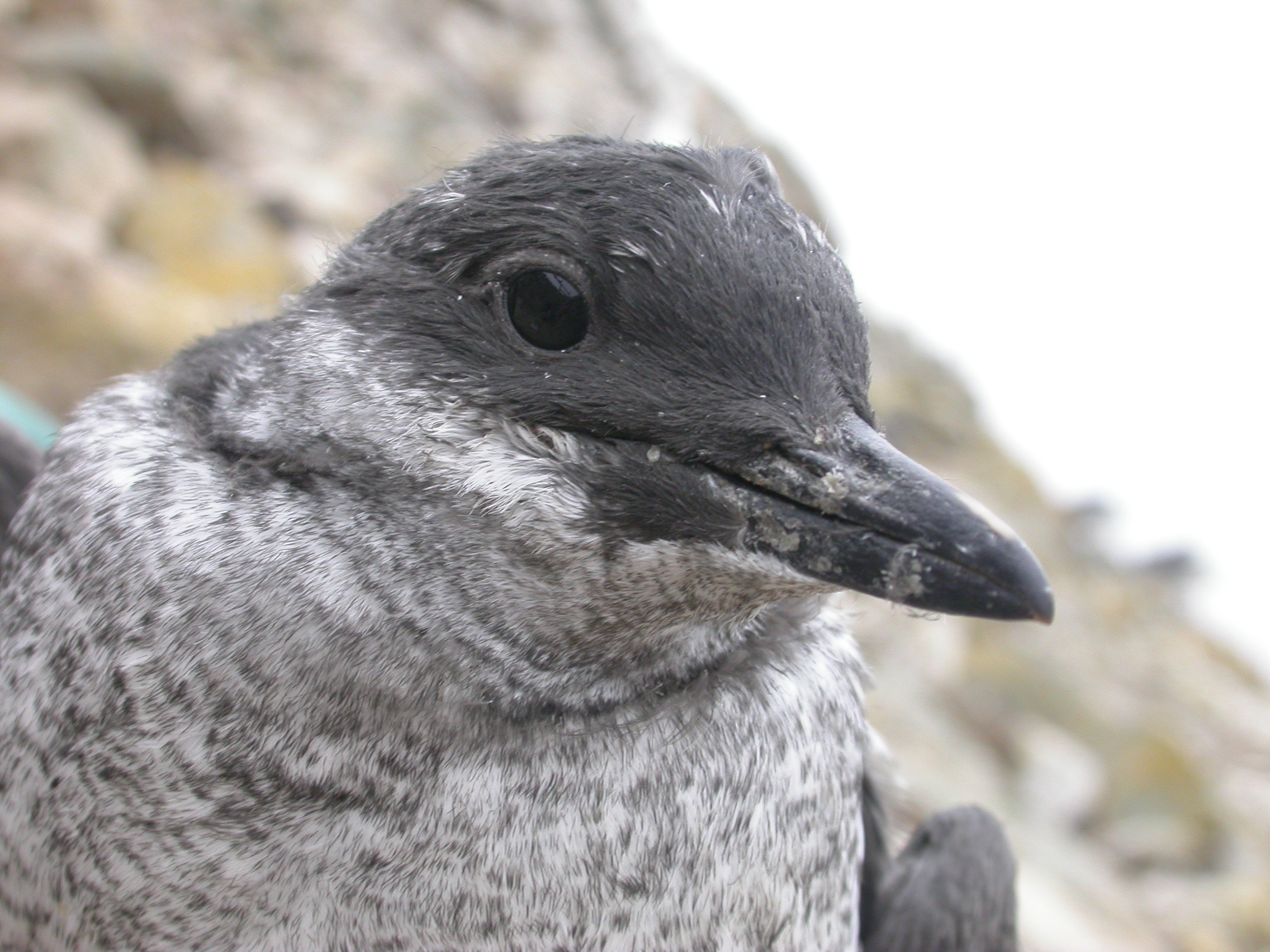
An almost fledged pigeon guillemot nestling

The chicks usually fledge 34 to 42 days after hatching, although the time taken to fledge has been known to take anywhere from 29 to 54 days. Chicks fledge by leaving the colony and flying to sea, after which they are independent of their parents and receive no post-fledging care. After this, the adult also leaves the colony. Young birds do not breed until at least three years after fledging, with most first breeding at four years of age. While they may not return to breed, two or three year old birds may start attending the breeding colony before they reach sexual maturity, arriving in the colony after the breeding birds. Pigeon guillemots that reach adulthood have an average life-expectancy of 4.5 years, and the oldest recorded individual lived for 14 years.

=== Calls and displays ===
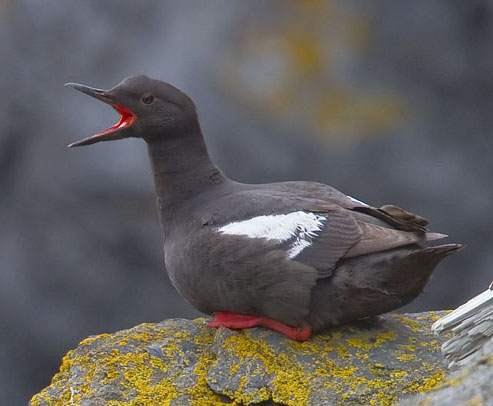
Adult calling

The pigeon guillemot is a very vocal bird, particularly during the breeding season, and makes several calls, some of which are paired with displays, to communicate with others of its kind. One such display call pairing is the conspicuous hunch-whistle, where the tail is slightly raised, the wings held slightly out and the head thrown back 45-90° while whistling, before snapping back to horizontal. The function of this call is to advertise ownership of a territory. Another call, the trill, denotes ownership over larger distances. Trills can be performed singly or as duets between pairs; if performed as a duet then the call also functions to help reinforce pair bond. Trills are usually given from a resting position, except for the trill-waggle, which has the bird raising its tail, opening its wings and ruffling the feathers of its neck and head, followed by a waggling of its outstretched neck and head. This display is antagonistic in a context where pigeon guillemots are in a group and often is the precursor to an attack. Low whistles are made by unpaired males attempting to attract a mate, and are deeper than hunch-whistles and involve less movement of the head. Other calls made include seeps and cheeps made between mates and screams made in the presence of predators.

=== Feeding ===
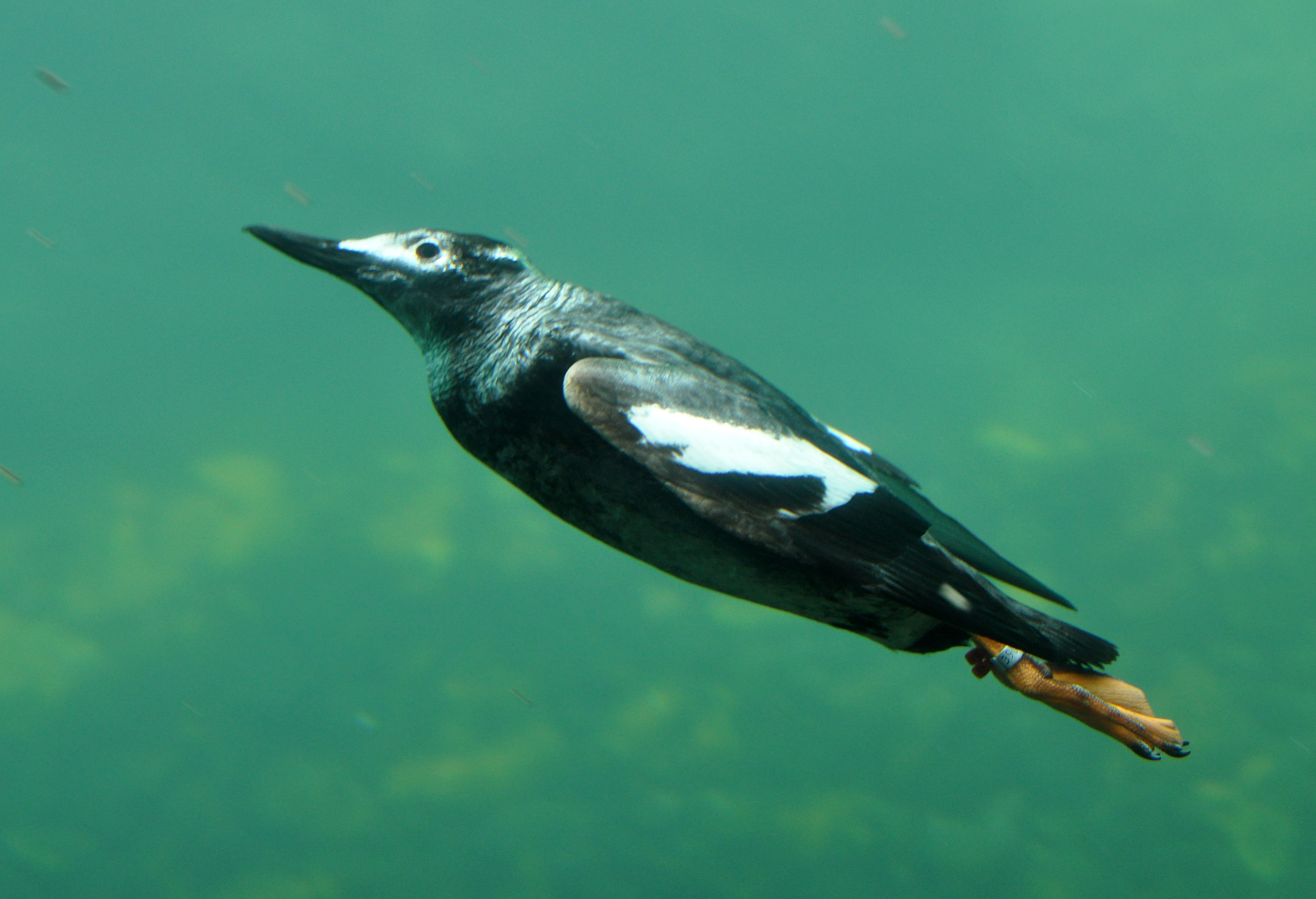
A pigeon guillemot diving at Living Coasts, Torquay, England

The pigeon guillemot forages by itself or in small groups, diving underwater for food, usually close to shore and during the breeding season within 1 km (0.6 mi) of the colony. It forages at depths from 6 to 45 m (20 to 148 ft), but it prefers depths between 15 and 20 m (50 and 70 ft). The dives can range from 10 to 144 seconds, and usually average 87 seconds, with an intermission between dives lasting around 98 seconds. Dives of two to ten seconds are typical when feeding on shoals of sandlance at the water's surface. Smaller prey are probably consumed underwater, but larger organisms are brought to the surface to eat after capture.

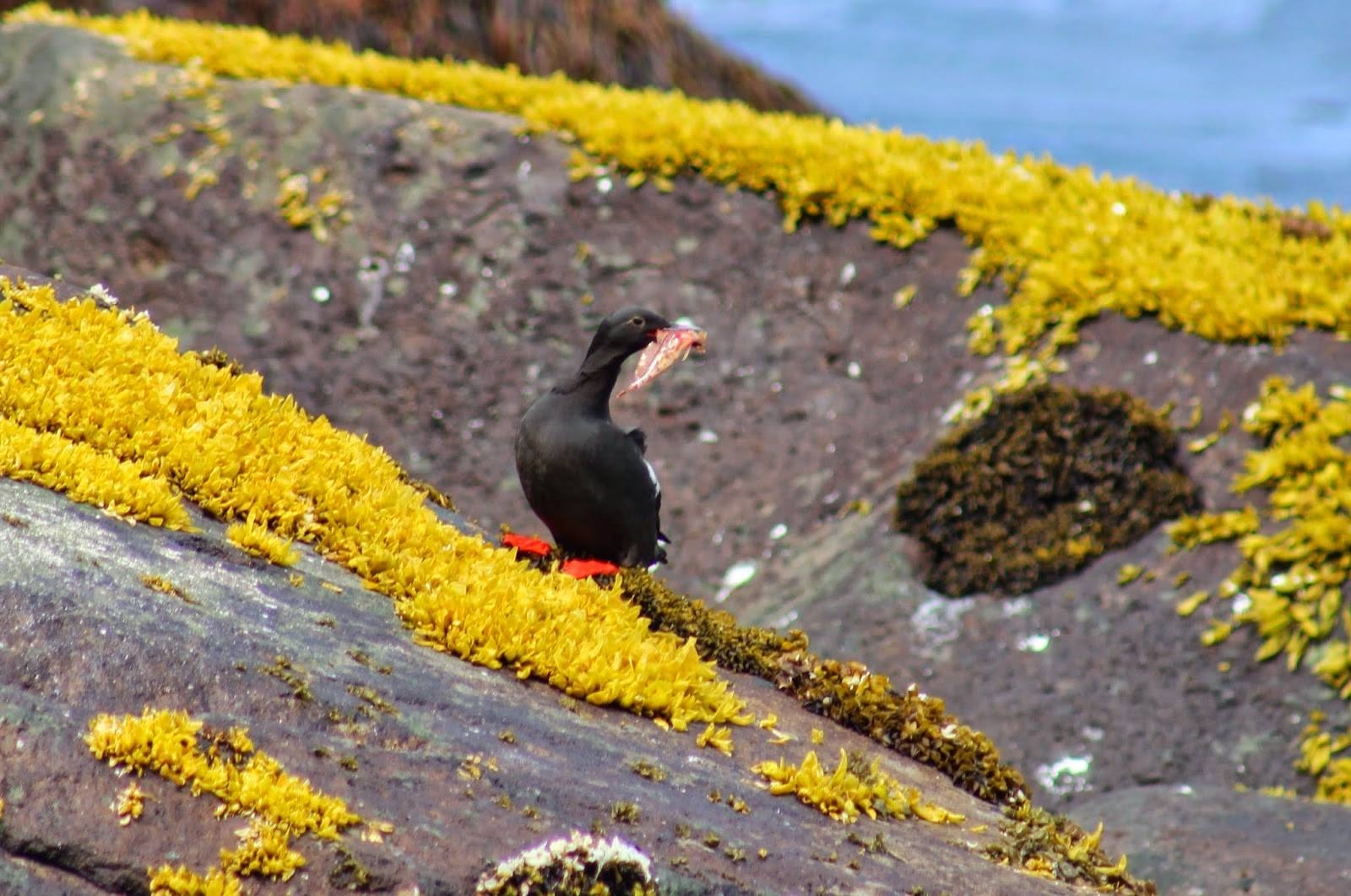
Feeding on Buldir Island, Alaska

The pigeon guillemot mostly feeds on benthic prey found at the lowest level in a body of water close to the sea floor, but it also takes some prey from higher in the water column. It mainly eats fish and other aquatic animals. Fish taken include sculpins, sandfish, cod, and capelin; invertebrates include shrimp and crabs like the pygmy rock crab, and even rarely polychaete worms, gastropods, bivalves and squid. The diet varies greatly, based on where the individual bird is, the season, and also from year to year, as ocean conditions change prey availability. For example, invertebrates are more commonly taken in winter. The foraging method used by this species differs from that of auks in other genera. It hangs upside down above the seafloor, probing with its head for prey and using its feet and wings to maintain position. The chick's diet varies slightly, with more fish than invertebrates, particularly rockfish (family Sebastidae). Specialization in the prey taken by a pigeon guillemot when foraging for its chicks generally results in greater reproductive success, with a high-lipid diet allowing for more growth.

The adult pigeon guillemot requires about 20% of its own weight, or 90 grams (3.2 oz) of food each day. It doubles its rate of fishing when feeding the nestlings. As the nestlings get older, they are fed more, until 11 days after hatching, when the food generally levels out. The food they get, although, starts to decrease about 30 days after hatching.

== Predators and parasites ==
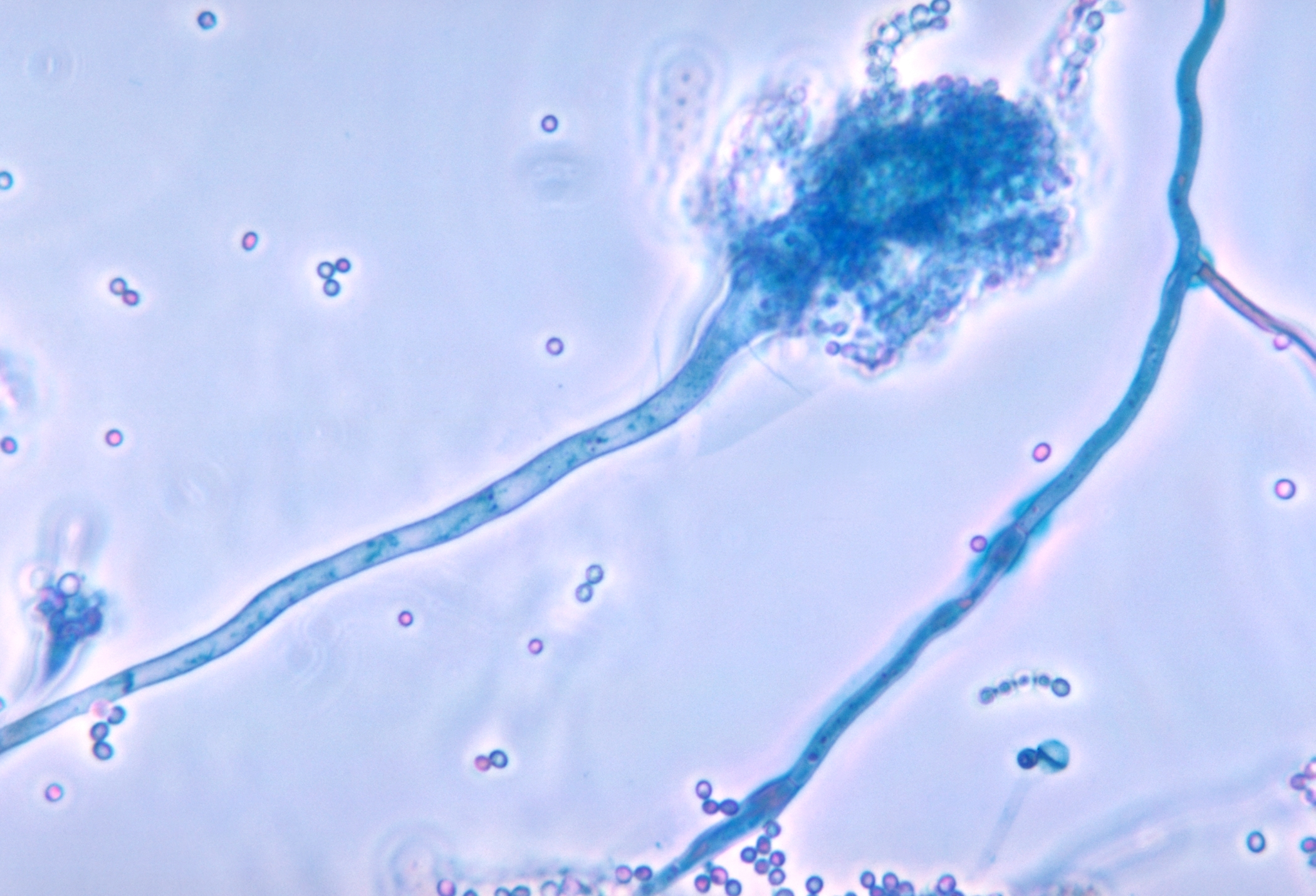
Aspergillus fumigatus, a fungal disease that affects this bird when in captivity

Avian predation is the most common cause of egg loss in the pigeon guillemot. Species that prey on the nests include the northwestern crow, a common predator of both eggs and chicks, as well as glaucous-winged gulls, stoats and garter snakes. Raccoons are also common predators, preying on eggs, chicks, and adults. Adults are sometimes hunted by bald eagles, peregrine falcons, great horned owls and northern goshawks. In the water, they have been reported to be taken by orca and giant Pacific octopuses.

This bird, especially its chicks, is vulnerable to Aspergillus fumigatus, a fungal disease, while in captivity. It is also vulnerable to the cestode Alcataenia campylacantha. Ticks (Ixodes uriae) and fleas (Ceratophyllus) have been recorded on chicks as well.

== Status ==
The pigeon guillemot is considered to be a least concern species by the International Union for Conservation of Nature. This is due to multiple factors, including its large population, estimated at 470,000 individuals, its stable population, and its large range, as this bird is thought to occur over a range of 15,400,000 km^{2} (5,950,000 mi^{2}). This bird is vulnerable to introduced mammalian predators, such as raccoons. The removal of introduced predators from breeding islands allows the species to recover. Climate change has a negative effect on this bird, and reproductive performance decreases with increased temperatures. It is also particularly vulnerable to oil, and adults near oiled shores display symptoms of hepatocellular injury, where elevated levels of aspartate aminotransferase can be found in the liver. Otherwise, the effects of oil spills on the pigeon guillemot are unclear. Unlike some seabirds, ingestion of plastic does not seem to be a problem for this species.
