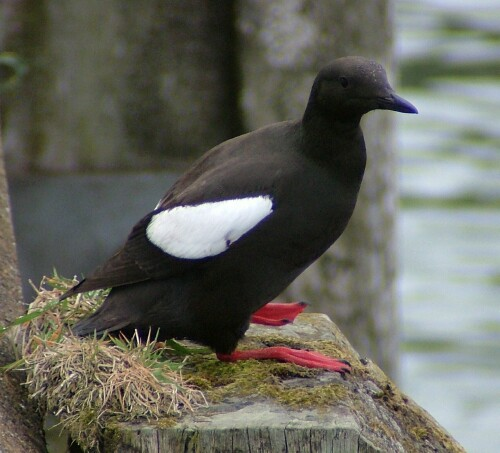
- Black guillemot ( Cepphus grylle)

Scientific classification
- Kingdom: Animalia
- Phylum: Chordata
- Class: Aves
- Order: Charadriiformes
- Family: Alcidae
- Genus: Cepphus; Pallas, 1769

Type species
- Cepphus lacteolus Pallas, 1769

Species
- Cepphus grylle Cepphus columba Cepphus carbo

= Cepphus =

Genus of birds

Cepphus is a genus of seabirds in the auk family also referred to as guillemots by association with the related genus Uria, (Note: also called murres) or tysties, (Note: singular tystie, UK: /ˈtaɪsti, ˈtiː-/ TY-stee, TEE-, -stih) from the Old Norse name for C. grylle.

== Etymology ==
The genus name Cepphus is from Ancient Greek κέπφος kepphos, a pale waterbird mentioned by Greek authors including Aristotle. The English word guillemot is from French from Guillaume, "William", but ultimately onomatopoeic from the loud, high-pitched "will, willem" begging calls of the newly fledged young of the common guillemot Uria aalge.

== Description ==
These are medium-sized birds with mainly black plumage in the breeding season, thin dark bills with a bright red gape, and bright red legs and feet. Two species have white wing patches, the third has white facial "spectacles". They are much paler in winter plumage, mottled above and white below.

The breeding habitat is rocky shores and islands on the coasts of the northern Atlantic and Pacific Oceans. They usually lay their eggs in rocky sites near water. They may overwinter in their breeding areas, moving to open waters, if necessary, but usually not migrating very far south.

They dive for food from the surface, swimming underwater to depths of usually less than 20 metres. They mainly eat fish and crustaceans, also some molluscs, jellyfish, and other invertebrates.

== Species ==
Three species are accepted:

Summer plumage	Winter plumage	Scientific name	Common name	Distribution
		Cepphus grylle	Black guillemot or tystie	Near-circumpolar; North Atlantic, Arctic coasts, northern Alaska
		Cepphus columba	Pigeon guillemot	Kuril Islands and the Kamchatka Peninsula in Siberia to coasts in western North America from Alaska to California
		Cepphus carbo	Spectacled guillemot	Sea of Okhotsk and the Kuril Islands in Russia and on the northern island of Hokkaidō in Japan

There are also fossil forms:

- Cepphus olsoni Howard, 1982 (San Luis Rey River Late Miocene - Early Pliocene of W USA)
- Cepphus storeri Harrison, 1977 (Red Crag of Suffolk Late Miocene - England
- Cepphus cf. columba (Lawrence Canyon Early Pliocene of W USA)
- Cepphus cf. grylle (San Diego Late Pliocene, W USA)

The latter two resemble the extant species, but because of the considerable distance in time or space from their current occurrence may represent distinct species.
