= Uria onoi =

Uria onoi Temporal range: Late Pleistocene

Scientific classification
- Kingdom: Animalia
- Phylum: Chordata
- Class: Aves
- Order: Charadriiformes
- Family: Alcidae
- Genus: Uria
- Species: †U. onoi

Binomial name
- †Uria onoi Watanabe et al., 2016

Extinct species of bird

Uria onoi is an extinct species of murre in the genus Uria that lived in the northeastern part of Japan in the Late Pleistocene.
