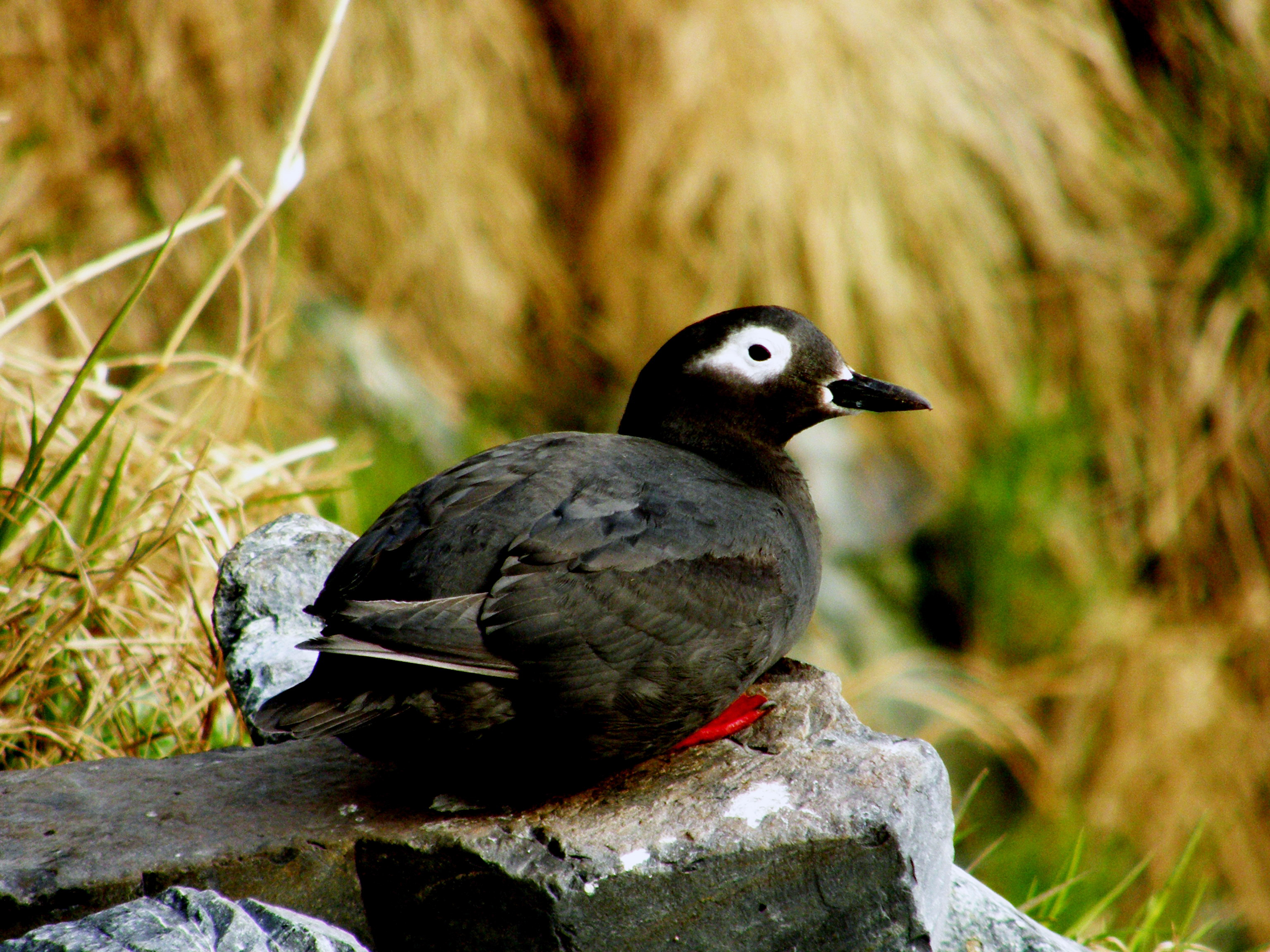

Conservation status
- Least Concern (IUCN 3.1)

Scientific classification
- Kingdom: Animalia
- Phylum: Chordata
- Class: Aves
- Order: Charadriiformes
- Family: Alcidae
- Genus: Cepphus
- Species: C. carbo

Binomial name
- Cepphus carbo Pallas, 1811

= Spectacled guillemot =

Species of bird

The spectacled guillemot or sooty guillemot (Cepphus carbo) is a seabird in the auk family.

== Description ==
This species is about 38 cm (15 in) long, with red legs, black bill, and a blackish iris.

The breeding adult spectacled guillemot is distinctive, mostly plumaged dull sooty-black except for conspicuous white "spectacles" on the face

In adult non-breeding plumage, the underparts are white, uniformly tipped very pale grey-brown. Transitional birds are like breeding adults, except the underparts are scaled with white.

Sexes are alike, but juveniles are separable from adults. There are no subspecies.

== Range ==
The spectacled guillemot's range is restricted to the northwestern Pacific Ocean: throughout the Sea of Okhotsk and the Kuril Islands in Russia and on the northern island of Hokkaidō in Japan. Its range overlaps with that of the closely related pigeon guillemot, though it extends further north.
