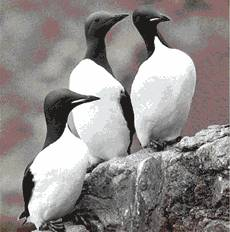
- Common murre between two thick-billed murres

Scientific classification
- Kingdom: Animalia
- Phylum: Chordata
- Class: Aves
- Order: Charadriiformes
- Family: Alcidae
- Genus: Uria; Brisson, 1760

Type species
- Colymbus aalge Pontoppidan, 1763

Species
- Uria aalge Uria lomvia

= Uria =

Uria Temporal range: Late Miocene–present

Genus of birds

Uria is a genus of seabirds in the auk family known in Europe as guillemots (a name also used for the genus Cepphus), and in North America as murres. These are medium-sized birds with mainly brown or black plumage in the breeding season. They breed on the coasts of the northern Atlantic and Pacific oceans.

== Taxonomy ==
The genus Uria was introduced by the French zoologist Mathurin Jacques Brisson in 1760 with the common murre (Uria aalge) as the type species. The genus is related to the razorbill, little auk, and the extinct great auk; these together make up the tribe Alcini. Despite the shared common name guillemot, they are not so closely related to the guillemots in the genus Cepphus, which form the tribe Cepphini.

== Etymology ==
The genus name is from Ancient Greek ouria, a waterbird mentioned by Athenaeus. The English name "guillemot" is of French origin, first attested by Pierre Belon in 1555, but derived from Old (11th century) French willelm, and matched by English variants willock (attested 1631), willick, will and wilkie, all from forms of the name William, cf. French: Guillaume, but ultimately onomatopoeic from the loud, high-pitched "will, willem" begging calls of the newly fledged young of the common guillemot. The American name "murre", also known from England (particularly Cornwall) from the 17th century, is by contrast, onomatopoeic of the growling call of adult common guillemots. In Newfoundland and Labrador the local name "turr" is also used.

=== Extant species ===
The genus contains two species:

Genus Uria – Brisson, 1760 – two species
Common name	Scientific name and subspecies	Range	Size and ecology	IUCN status and estimated population
Common murre or common guillemot	Uria aalge (Linnaeus, 1758) Five subspecies: U. a. aalge; U. a. albionis; U. a. hyperborea; U. a. inornata; U. a. californica'	Northern Atlantic and Pacific Oceans, breeding in the Atlantic from northwestern Spain (and formerly Portugal) north to Svalbard, and Nova Scotia north to Greenland, and in the Pacific, from California north to Alaska, and northernmost Japan north to eastern Siberia; additionally wintering a little further south.	Size: Habitat: Diet:	LC
Thick-billed murre or Brünnich's guillemot	Uria lomvia (Linnaeus, 1758) Four subspecies: U. l. lomvia – (Linnaeus, 1758); U. l. eleonorae – (Portenko, 1937); U. l. heckeri – (Portenko, 1944); U. l. arra – (Pallas, 1811)	Northern Hemisphere	Size: Habitat: Diet:	LC

=== Fossils ===
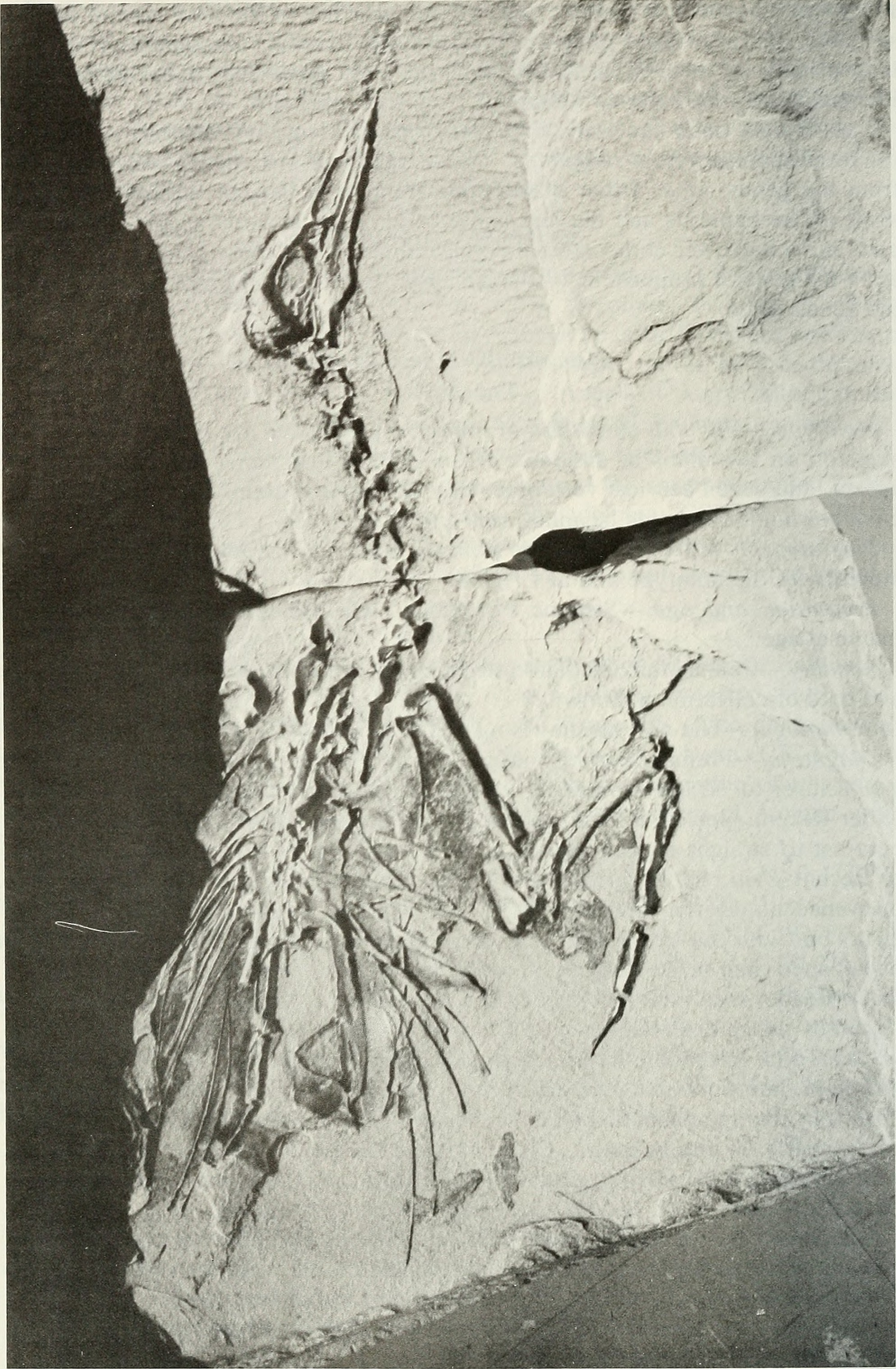
Uria brodkorbi, a fossil murre from the Monterey Formation of southern California

Some prehistoric Uria species are also known:

- Uria bordkorbi Howard, 1981 (Monterey or Sisquoc, Late Miocene of Lompoc, USA)
- Uria affinis (Marsh, 1872) (Late Pleistocene of E USA) - possibly a subspecies of U. lomvia
- Uria paleohesperis Howard, 1982 (Late Miocene of W USA)
- Uria onoi Watanabe, Matsuoka & Hasegawa, 2016 (Middle-Late Pleistocene of Japan)

U. brodkorbi is notable insofar as it is the only known occurrence of the Alcini tribe in the temperate to subtropical Pacific, except for the very fringe of the range of U. aalge. It suggests that the Uria species, which are the sister taxon to all the other Alcini, and like them are usually believed to have evolved in the Atlantic, may have evolved in the Caribbean or possibly close to the Isthmus of Panama. The modern Pacific distribution would then be part of a later arctic expansion, whereas most other auk lineages form clades with a continuous range in the Pacific, from arctic to subtropical waters.

== Description ==
These birds breed in large colonies on coastal cliffs, laying single elongated conical eggs directly on cliff ledges. They move south in winter to keep in ice-free waters.

They dive for food from the surface, swimming underwater and being among the deepest divers of all birds, using their stubby wings to routinely dive to more than 180 metres, and feeding on fish and crustaceans, also some molluscs.

Adult birds are black or brown on the head, neck, back and wings with white underparts. The bill is long and pointed. They have a small rounded black tail. The lower face becomes white in winter.

The flight is strong and direct, and these species have fast wing beats due to the short wings.

Uria guillemots produce a variety of harsh cackling calls at the breeding colonies, but are mostly silent at sea except when still with dependent young for a month or two after leaving the breeding colonies; they are then still very vocal, with young having a high-pitched whistle (see also #Etymology, above). The calls are very variable between different individuals, which is important in allowing individual recognition between the young and their parents at sea after leaving the nest, with the adult and the chick recognising each others' individual calls.
