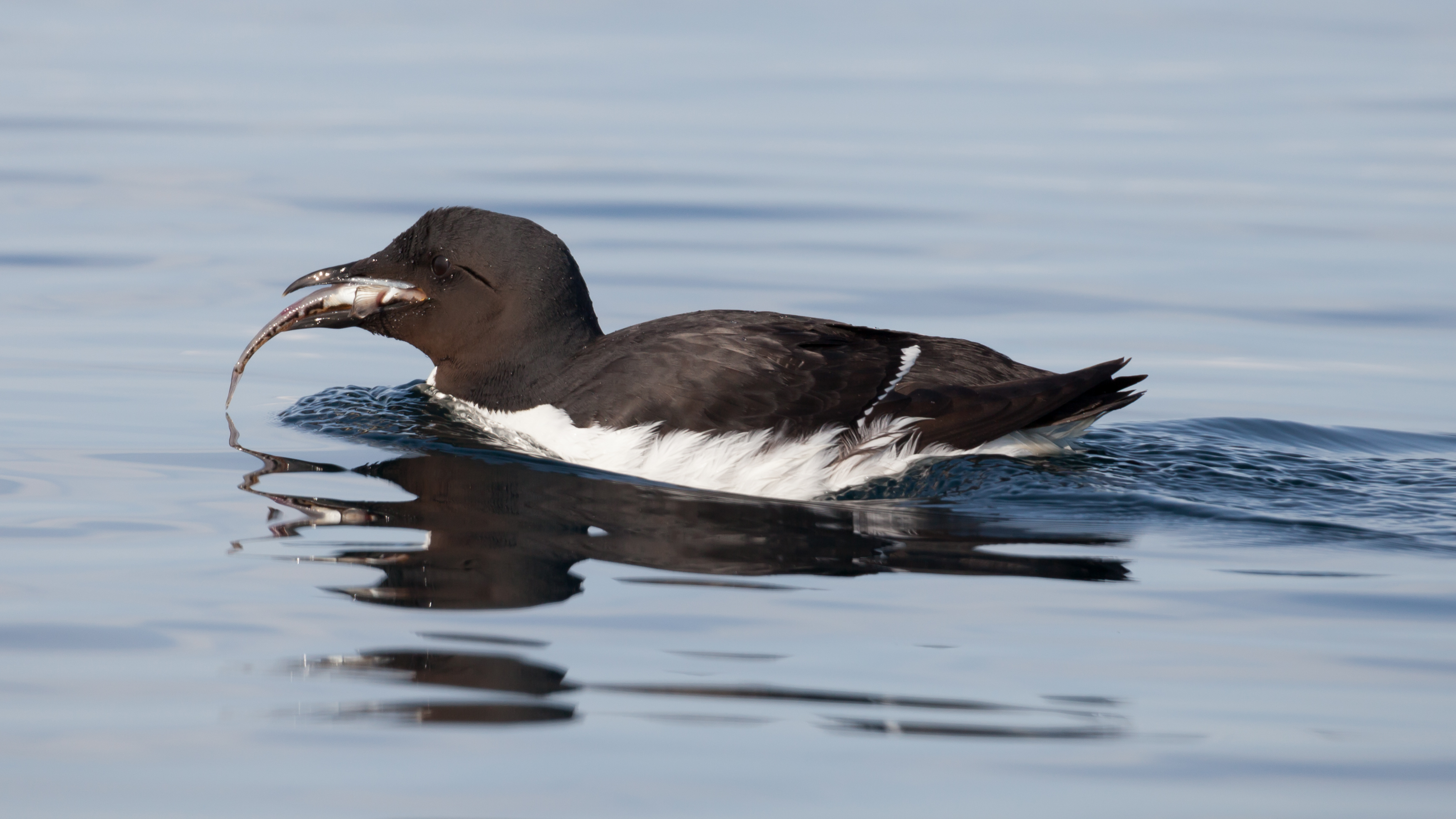
- Adult U. l. lomvia in breeding plumage, with fish, Svalbard

Conservation status
- Least Concern (IUCN 3.1)

Scientific classification
- Kingdom: Animalia
- Phylum: Chordata
- Class: Aves
- Order: Charadriiformes
- Family: Alcidae
- Genus: Uria
- Species: U. lomvia

Binomial name
- Uria lomvia (Linnaeus, 1758)

Subspecies
- Uria lomvia lomvia – (Linnaeus, 1758); U. l. eleonorae – (Portenko, 1937); Uria lomvia heckeri – (Portenko, 1944); U. l. arra – (Pallas, 1811)

Synonyms
- Alca lomvia Linnaeus, 1758 (protonym)

= Thick-billed murre =

Species of bird

The thick-billed murre or Brünnich's guillemot (Uria lomvia) is a bird in the auk family (Alcidae). This bird is named after the Danish zoologist Morten Thrane Brünnich. The very deeply black North Pacific subspecies Uria lomvia arra is also called Pallas' murre after its describer.

== Taxonomy ==
The thick-billed murre was formally described in 1758 by the Swedish naturalist Carl Linnaeus in the tenth edition of his Systema Naturae. He placed it with the other auks in the genus Alca and coined the binomial name Alca lomvia. Linnaeus specified the type locality as boreal Europe but this was restricted in 1921 to Greenland by the German ornithologist Ernst Hartert. The thick-billed murre is now placed together with the common murre in the genus Uria that was introduced in 1760 by the French zoologist Mathurin Jacques Brisson. The genus name is from Ancient Greek ouria, a waterbird mentioned by Athenaeus. The specific epithet lomvia is a Swedish word for an auk or diver. The English "guillemot" is from French guillemot probably derived from Guillaume, "William". "Murre" is of uncertain origins, but may imitate the call of the common guillemot.

Four subspecies are recognised:

- U. l. lomvia (Linnaeus, 1758) – coastal northeast, southeast Canada, Greenland, Iceland, Jan Mayen (northeast of Iceland), north Scandinavia, Svalbard (north of Norway) to Novaya Zemlya (northwest Russia)
- U. l. eleonorae Portenko, 1937 – coastal east Taymyr Peninsula to New Siberian Islands (central north Russia)
- U. l. heckeri Portenko, 1944 – Wrangel and Herald Islands (north of northeast Siberia) and Chukchi Peninsula (northeast Siberia)
- U. l. arra (Pallas, 1811) – coastal Kamchatka Peninsula, Sea of Okhotsk, Kuril Islands and Commander Islands (east Russia), Aleutian Islands, west, southeast Alaska, north Yukon (northwest Canada)

== Description ==
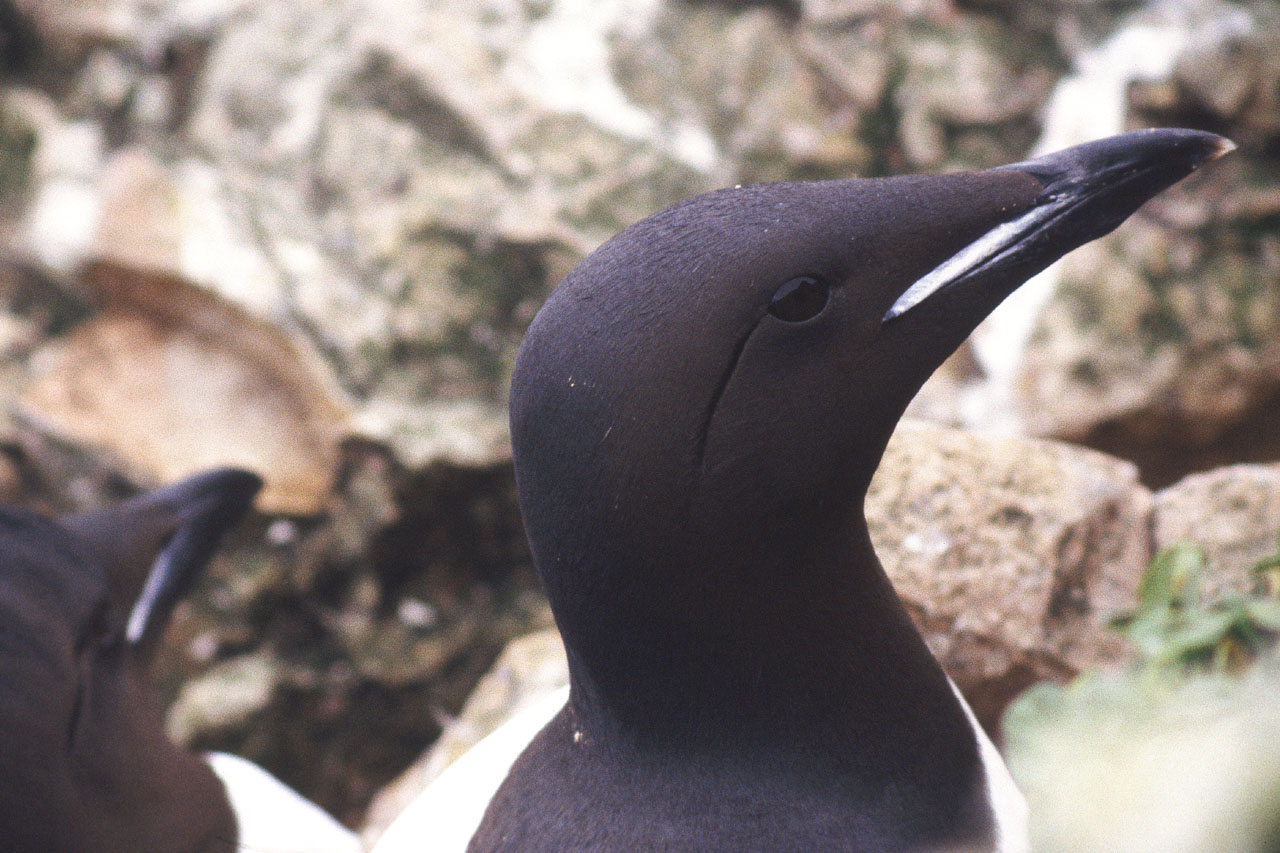
Head color in breeding plumage is identical in all Brünnich's guillemots

Since the extinction of the great auk in the mid-19th century, the murres are the largest living members of the Alcidae. The thick-billed murre and the closely related common guillemot (or common murre, U. aalge) are similarly sized, but the thick-billed murre is larger in both average and maximum size. The thick-billed murre measures 40–48 cm (16–19 in) in total length, spans 64–81 cm (25–32 in) across the wings and weighs 736–1,481 g (26.0–52.2 oz). The Pacific race (U. l. arra) is larger than the Atlantic race, especially in bill dimensions.

Adult birds are black on the head, neck, back and wings with white underparts. The bill is long and pointed. They have a small rounded black tail. The lower face becomes white in winter. This species produces a variety of harsh cackling calls at the breeding colonies, but is silent at sea.

They differ from the common murre in their thicker, shorter bill with a white gape stripe and their darker head and back; the "bridled" morph is unknown in U. lomvia – a murre has either a white eye-stripe, or a white bill-stripe, or neither, but never both; it may be that this is character displacement, enabling individual birds to recognize conspecifics at a distance in the densely packed breeding colonies as the bridled morph is most common by far in North Atlantic colonies where both species of guillemots breed. In winter, there is less white on the thick-billed murre's face. They look shorter than the common murre in flight. First-year birds have smaller bills than adults and the white line on the bill is often obscure, making the bill an unreliable way to identify them at this age. The head pattern is the best way to distinguish first-year birds from common murres.

== Distribution and habitat ==
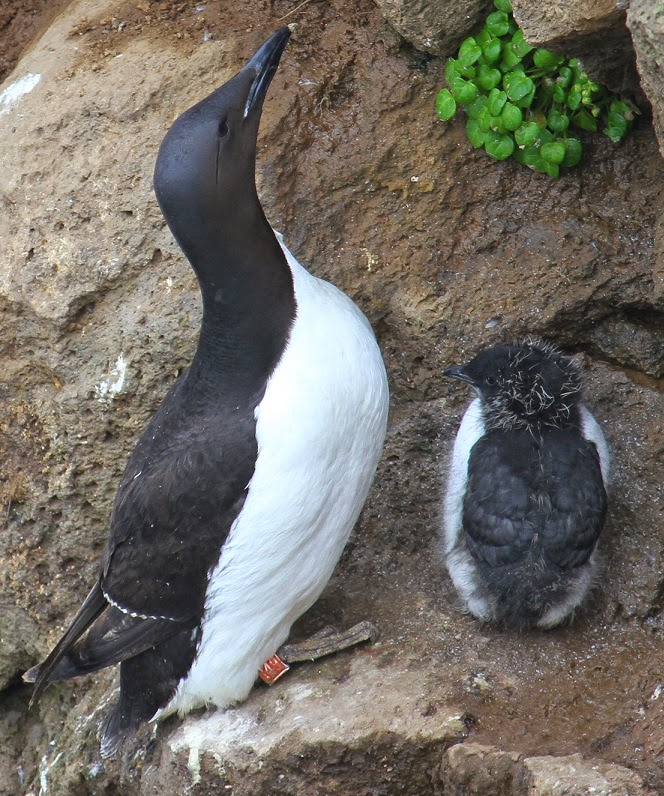
Adult and chick, Buldir Island, Alaska

The thick-billed murre is distributed across the polar and sub-polar regions of the Northern Hemisphere where four subspecies exist; one lives on the Atlantic and Arctic oceans of North America (U. l. lomvia), another on the Pacific coast of North America (U. l. arra), and two others that inhabit the Russian Arctic (U. l. eleonorae and U. heckeri).

Thick-billed murres spend all of their lives at sea in waters which remain below 5°C, except during the breeding season when they form dense colonies on cliffs. They move south in winter into northernmost areas of the north Atlantic and Pacific, but only to keep in ice-free waters.

=== As a vagrant ===
Brünnich's guillemot is a rare vagrant in European countries south of the breeding range. In Britain, over 30 individuals have been recorded, but over half of these were tideline corpses. Of those that were seen alive, only three have remained long enough to be seen by large numbers of observers. All three were in Shetland - winter individuals in February 1987 and November/December 2005, and a bird in an auk colony in summer 1989. The 1989 and 2005 birds were both found by the same observer, Martin Heubeck.

The species has been recorded once in Ireland, and has also been recorded in the Netherlands. In the western Atlantic, they may range as far as Florida, and in the Pacific to California. Before 1950, large numbers appeared on the North American Great Lakes in early winter, passing up the St. Lawrence River from the East coast. Such irruptions have not been seen since 1952.

== Behaviour and ecology ==
=== Breeding ===
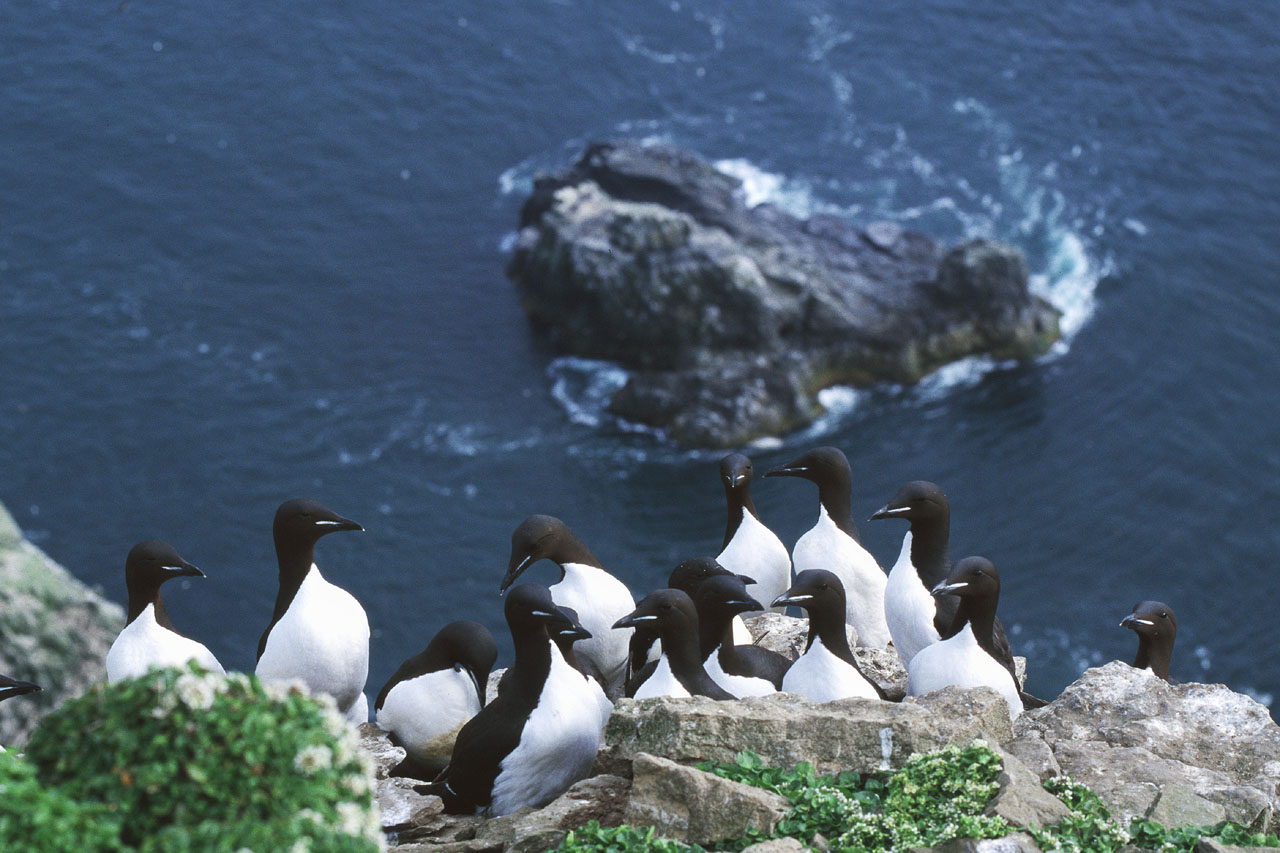
Breeding colony at Stappen, Bear Island. Note bill-stripes visible at a distance.

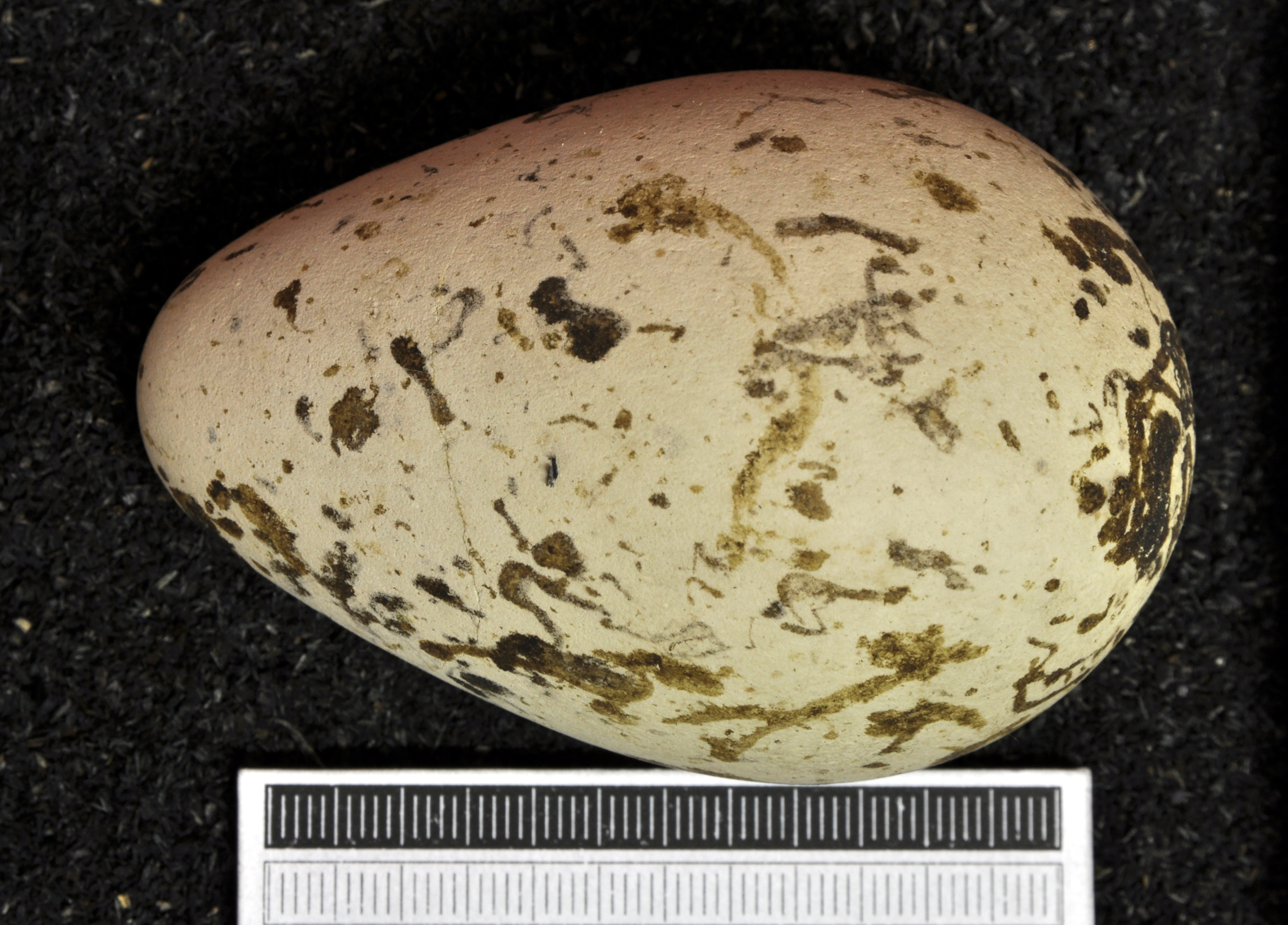
Egg, Collection Museum Wiesbaden

Thick-billed murres form vast breeding colonies, sometimes composed of over a million breeding birds, on narrow ledges and steep cliffs which face the water. They have the smallest territory of any bird, requiring less than one square foot per individual. A breeding pair will lay a single egg each year. Despite this, they are one of the most abundant marine birds in the Northern Hemisphere.

Adults perform communal displays early in the breeding season to time their breeding cycles. They do not build nests, but lay the egg directly on bare rock. Both parents are involved in incubating the egg and raising the young. Due to the enormous amount of energy needed to take off in flight, adults can only provide one food item at a time to their chick. Chicks spend between 18 and 25 days on the cliffs before leaving for the sea. Once ready to leave, the young will await nightfall and jump off the edge towards the water. A parent immediately jumps after and glides within centimeters of the fledgling. At sea, the male and the chick stay together for around 8 weeks during which the adult continues to provide food for the young.

Survival rates of the young are not based on the number of individuals in the colony, but rather on the age of the breeders within the colony. Offspring of inexperienced pairs grow more slowly than those of experienced breeders, possibly because they do not receive as much food from their parents. Also, pairs which contain at least one young breeding bird tend to have lower hatch rates. Older and experienced adults obtain the better nesting sites located in the center of the colony, while the inexperienced individuals are kept on the margins where their young are more likely to be preyed upon.

=== Food and feeding ===
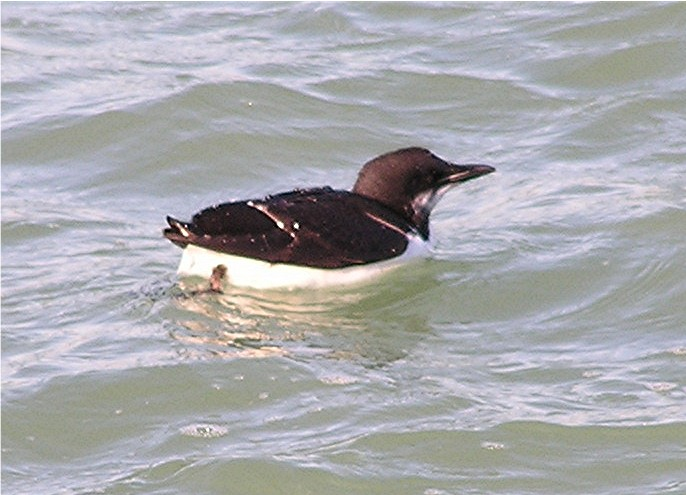
Vagrant adult in winter plumage, northern South Carolina

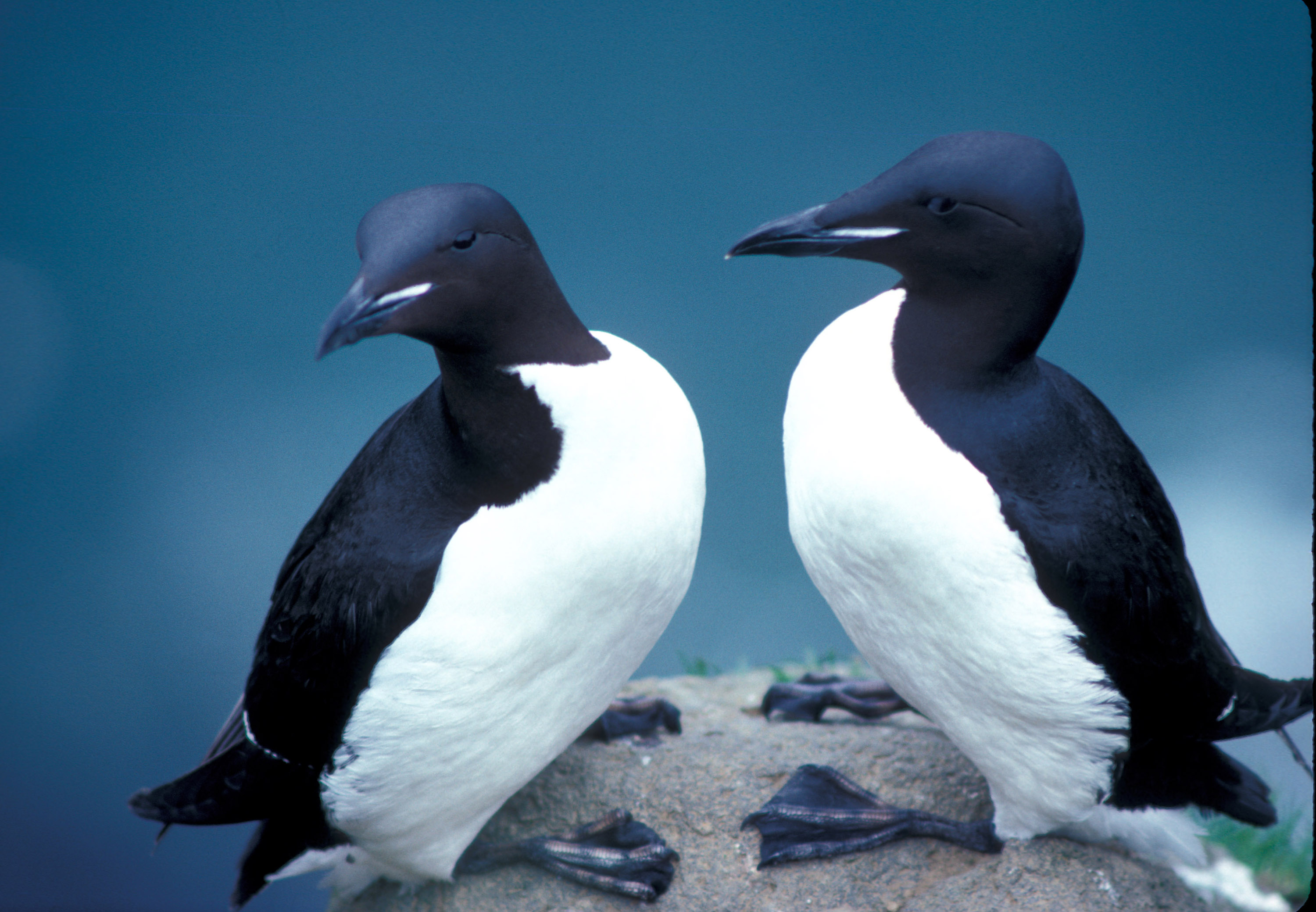
Thick-billed murres in Alaska Maritime National Wildlife Refuge

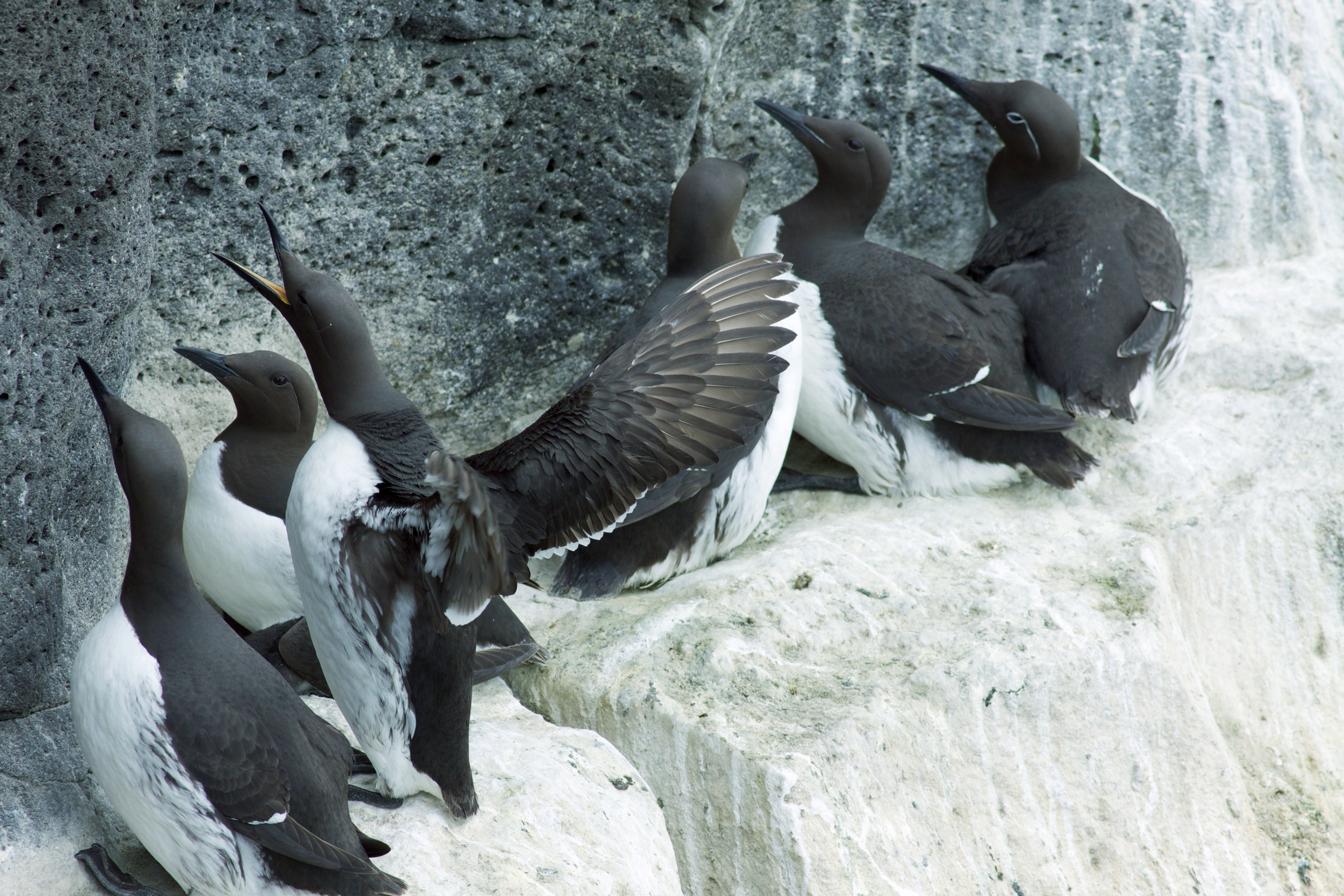
A thick-billed murre (second from right, distinguishable by white marking on bill) with a group of common murres in Reykjanes, Iceland

The thick-billed murre has a strong, direct flight and rapid wingbeats owing to its short wings. Like the other auks, these birds forage for food by using their wings to 'swim' underwater. They are accomplished divers, reaching depths of up to 150 m and diving for up to four minutes at a time; usually, however, birds make either short, shallow dives or dive to depths of 21–40 m for longer periods While hunting, the diving trajectory resembles a flattened 'U'. Birds will make long trips to get to favorite feeding grounds; while they usually forage several dozen km from their nest sites, they often travel more than 100 km to fish. The strong and direct flight of murres, which is, for their body size, the most costly form of sustained locomotion of any animal, is a result of their short wingspan.

The diving depths and durations regularly achieved by these birds indicate that they, and similar auks, have some—as yet unknown—mechanism to avoid diving sickness and lung collapse when surfacing. It is postulated that auks temporarily absorb excess gases into the vascular structure of their bones. From there, the gases are gradually released from temporary storage in a controlled process of decompression.

The nominate race feeds primarily on fish such as Gadus spp. and Arctic cod (Boreogadus saida), as well as the pelagic amphipod Parathemisto libellula. Other fish such as capelin (Mallotus villosus) and Myoxocephalus spp., as well as other crustaceans, polychaetes, and a few molluscs, are found in their diet but in relatively low numbers. When wintering near Newfoundland, capelin can account for over 90 percent of their diet.

== Predators ==
Thick-billed murres have few natural predators because the immense number of concentrated birds found on the breeding colonies and the inaccessibility of these breeding sites make it extremely difficult for them to be preyed upon. Their main predator is the glaucous gull (Larus hyperboreus), which feeds exclusively on eggs and chicks. The common raven (Corvus corax) may also try to obtain eggs and hatchlings when they are left unattended.

== Status and conservation ==
Although declines have been observed in many parts of their range, the thick-billed murre is not a species of concern as the total population is estimated to contain between 15 and 20 million individuals worldwide.

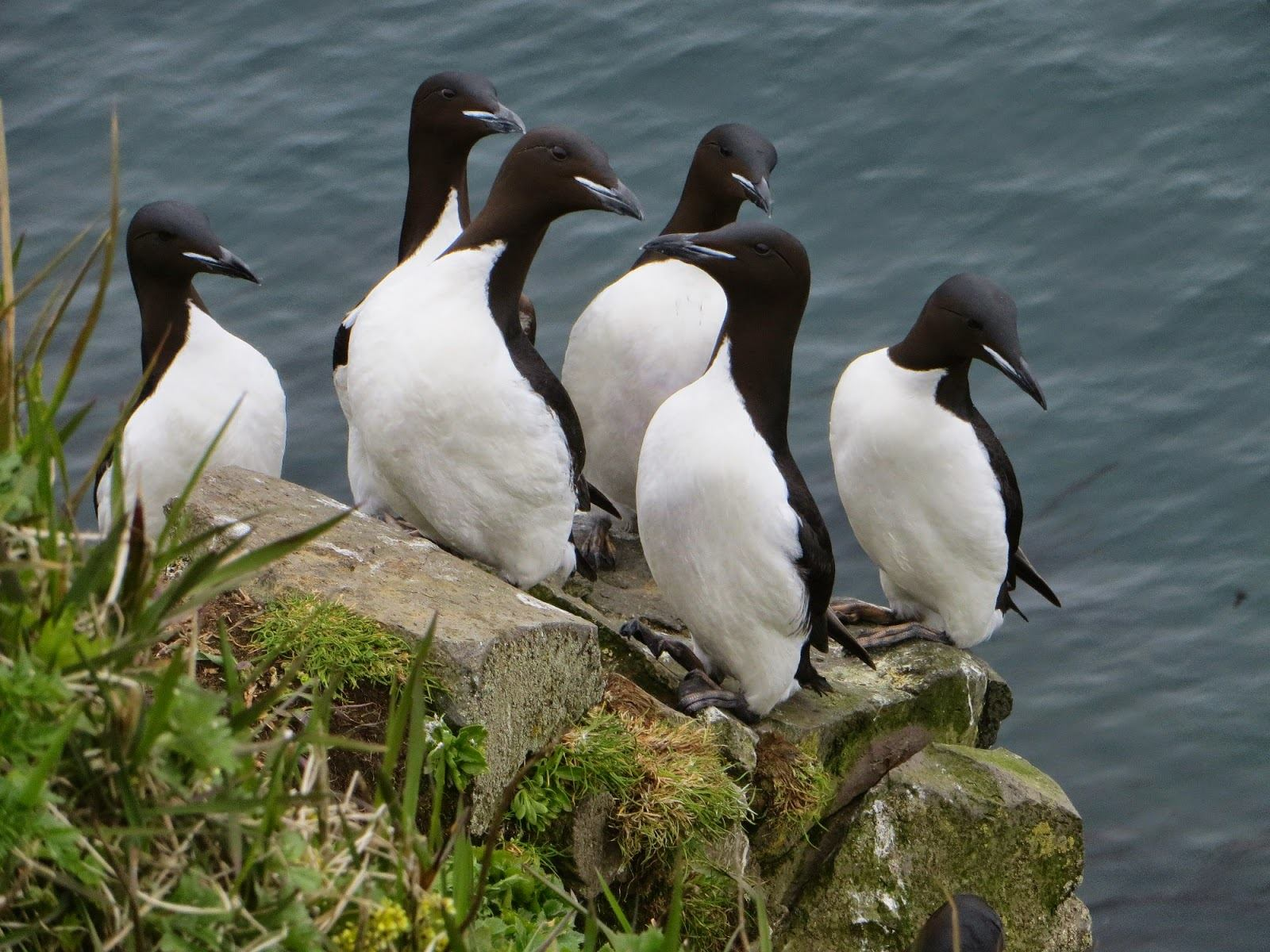
Group on rocks, Alaska

Egg harvesting and hunting of adult birds are major threats in Greenland, where populations fell steeply between the 1960s and 1980s. In the Barents Sea region, the species has declined locally, due to influences associated with polar stations in Russia. Fisheries may also be a threat, but because thick-billed murres are better able to use alternative food sources the effect of over-fishing is not as severe as on the common murre. Pollution from oil at sea poses another major threat. Murres are among the seabirds most sensitive to oil contamination. Incidental mortality brought on by entanglement with fishing gear is also an important cause of population decline.

Thick-billed murres are closely associated with sea-ice throughout the year. Consequently, some scientists believe that climate change may be a threat to this Arctic-breeding species. However, the species seems adaptable. Populations at the southern edge of their range switched from feeding on ice-associated Arctic cod to warmer-water capelin as ice break-up became earlier. Dates for egg-laying advanced with the earlier disappearance of ice. The growth of chicks is slower in years when ice break-up is early relative to egg-laying by the murres. In extremely warm years, mosquitoes and heat kill some breeders.

== Sources ==
- Bakken, Vidar; Pokrovskaya, Irina V. (2000). "Brünnich's Guillemot". In Anker-Nilssen, T.; Bakken, Vidar; Strom, H.; Golovkin, A.N.; Bianki, V.V.; Tatarinkova, I.P. (eds.). The Status of Marine Birds Breeding in the Barents Sea Region. Norwegian Polar Institute Report Series Volume 113. Trondheim, Norway: Norwegian Polar Institute. pp. 119–124. ISBN 978-82-7666-176-7.
- Evans, Peter, G.H & Kampp, K. (1991): Recent changes in Thick-billed Murre populations. In: Gaston, A.J & Elliot, R.D. (eds.): Studies of high-latitude seabirds: 2. Conservation biology of Thick-billed Murres in the Northwestern Atlantic. Canadian Wildlife Service Occasional Paper 69: 7–14.
- Gaston, Anthony J (1984). "How to distinguish first-year murres, Uria spp., from older birds in winter". Canadian Field-Naturalist. 98: 52–55. doi:10.5962/p.355087.
- Gaston, Anthony J (1988). "The mystery of the murres: Thick-billed murres, Uria lomvia, in the Great Lakes region, 1890-1986". Canadian Field-Naturalist. 102 (4): 705–711. doi:10.5962/p.356656.
- Gaston, Anthony J.; Nettleship, David N. (1981): The Thick-billed murres of Prince Leopold Island. Canadian Wildlife Service Monograph No. 6, Environment Canada, Ottawa. ISBN 0-660-10857-7
- Gaston, Anthony J.; Jones, Ian L. (1998): The Auks: Alcidae, Bird Families of the World, Oxford: Oxford University Press. ISBN 0-19-854032-9
- Gaston, Anthony J.; Hipfner, J. Mark; Campbell, D. (2003). "Heat and mosquitoes cause breeding failures and adult mortality in an Arctic-nesting seabird". Ibis. 144 (2): 185–191. doi:10.1046/j.1474-919x.2002.00038.x.
- Gaston, Anthony J.; Woo, Kerry; Hipfner, J. Mark (2003). "Trends in Forage Fish Populations in Northern Hudson Bay since 1981, as Determined from the Diet of Nestling Thick-Billed Murres Uria lomvia [English with French abstract]" (PDF). Arctic. 56 (3): 227–233. doi:10.14430/arctic618. Archived from the original (PDF) on 2008-04-10.
- Gaston, Anthony J.; Gilchrist, H.G.; Hipfner, J. Mark (2005). "Climate change, ice conditions and reproduction in an Arctic nesting marine bird: Brunnich's guillemot (Uria lomvia L.)". Journal of Animal Ecology. 74 (5): 832–841. Bibcode:2005JAnEc..74..832G. doi:10.1111/j.1365-2656.2005.00982.x.
- Lilliendahl, K.; Solmundsson, J.; Gudmundsson, G.A. & Taylor, L. (2003): Can surveillance radar be used to monitor the foraging distribution of colonially breeding alcids? [English with Spanish abstract] Condor 105(1): 145–150. DOI: 10.1650/0010-5422(2003)105[145:CSRBUT]2.0.CO;2 HTML abstract
- Nettleship, David N. (1996): 3. Thick-billed Murre. In: del Hoyo, Josep; Elliott, Andrew & Sargatal, Jordi (eds.) (1996), Handbook of Birds of the World (Volume 3: Hoatzin to Auks): 710–711, plate 59. Lynx Edicions, Barcelona. ISBN 84-87334-20-2
- Parmesan, Camille (2006). "Ecological and Evolutionary Responses to Recent Climate Change" (PDF). Annu. Rev. Ecol. Evol. Syst. 37: 637–669. doi:10.1146/annurev.ecolsys.37.091305.110100. Archived from the original (PDF) on 2007-01-05.
- Tuck, Leslie M. (1960). The Murres; their distribution, populations and biology: A study of the genus Uria. Ottawa: Department of Northern Affairs and National Resources, National Parks Branch, Canadian Wildlife Service.
- Wiese Francis, K.; Robertson Greg, J.; Gaston Anthony, J. (2003). "Impact of chronic oil pollution and the murre hunt in Newfoundland on the Thick-billed Murre Uria lomvia populations in the eastern Canadian Arctic". Biological Conservation. 116 (2): 205–216. doi:10.1016/s0006-3207(03)00191-5.
