= Long-term ecological research =

Ecological research conducted over extended periods

Long-term ecological research is a form of ecological research that involves observing or experimenting over extended periods, often spanning several years or decades. The duration of such research mainly depends on the organisms and biological processes under investigation, particularly when these unfold over multiple generations or cannot be adequately studied within a shorter timeframe.

Long-term ecological research covers a wide range of subjects, from individual organisms and populations to communities and even entire ecosystems. Some studies consist in assessing the relationship between human activities and the natural environment. Researchers draw on field observations, experiments, environmental measurements, modelling and historical records to trace changes over time. By continuing their work for many months or years, they can identify trends that might otherwise be obscured by short-term fluctuations, document rare disturbances and examine ecological and evolutionary changes that can sometimes take several generations to become apparent.

== Definition and scope ==
There is no a priori universally applicable minimum duration that makes an ecological study long-term. Its necessary length depends on the temporal scale of the process being investigated. A decade may encompass many generations of a short-lived insect but only a small part of the lifespan of a long-lived tree or vertebrate. Long-term research is therefore defined in relation to the biological processes and environmental changes under examination rather than by a single numerical threshold.

Long-term ecological research overlaps with environmental monitoring, but the terms are not synonymous. Monitoring consists of repeated measurements intended to detect the condition or trajectory of a population or environment. Long-term research generally uses such measurements to test hypotheses, investigate causal mechanisms or develop ecological theory. A single programme may perform both functions, for example by maintaining annual population counts while also carrying out experiments or analysing the causes of observed changes.

Long-term ecological studies vary in scale. Some follow individually marked animals within a single population; others measure nutrient flows through an ecosystem, apply experimental treatments to permanent plots or compare standardised observations across networks of sites. More recent approaches also include social–ecological systems, in which ecological changes are studied together with land use, institutions, economies and human communities.

== History ==
=== Early long-term studies ===
Some long-term ecological programmes began before ecology had developed as a distinct academic discipline. The Park Grass Experiment at Rothamsted Research was established in 1856 to examine how fertilisers and manures affected hay production. Continued observation revealed long-term changes in plant diversity, soil acidity and community composition, and the experiment subsequently became an important resource for ecological and evolutionary research.

Long-term studies of wild bird populations also developed during the first half of the twentieth century. David Lack, a British ornithologist and evolutionary biologist, was an important early advocate of quantitative population studies of birds. In Population Studies of Birds (1966), Lack reviewed a series of long-term studies and used them to examine questions of population regulation, reproductive success and the factors affecting animal numbers. The book drew on a number of studies conducted by Lack and other ornithologists, including earlier work that had followed individually identifiable birds over many years.

Among the pioneering individual-based bird studies was the work of Lance Richdale on yellow-eyed penguins in Otago Peninsula, New Zealand. Richdale began studying the species in 1936 and followed individually marked birds for 18 years, through 1954. His observations included breeding, survival, reproduction and age-related changes, and provided some of the earliest detailed demographic data for a wild bird population.

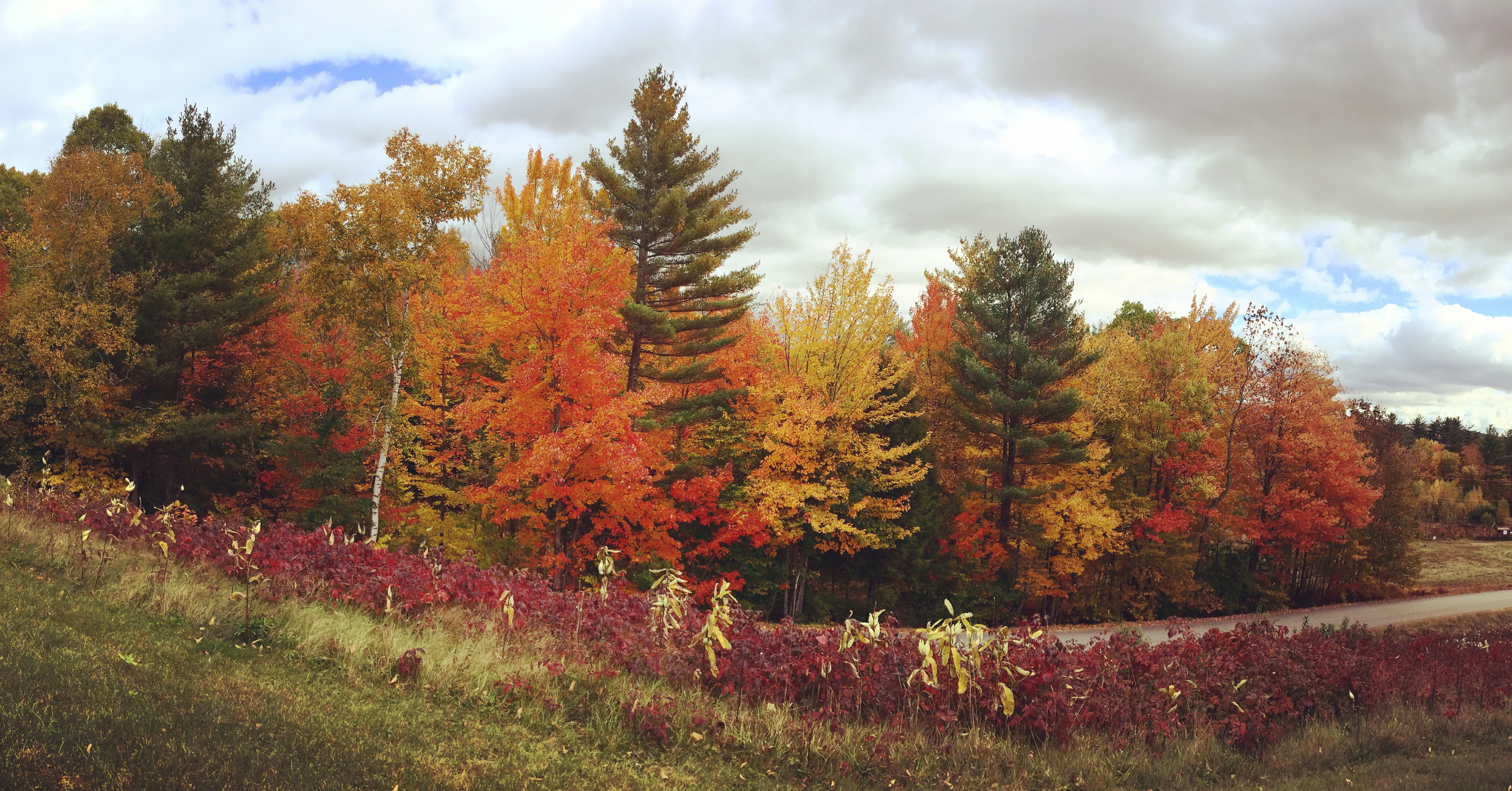
The Hubbard Brook Experimental Forest in New Hampshire, site of the long-running Hubbard Brook Ecosystem Study.

During the twentieth century, long-running studies increasingly focused on identifiable populations and ecological interactions. The Wytham Tit Project began in 1947 and developed into a continuous study of individually marked woodland birds. Annual observations of wolves and moose on Isle Royale began in 1958, while the Hubbard Brook Ecosystem Study, established in 1963, combined measurements of water, soils, vegetation and animals at the scale of forested watersheds.

=== Development of research networks ===
In 1980, the United States National Science Foundation established its Long-Term Ecological Research programme to support site-based investigation of ecological phenomena over periods longer than conventional research grants. Its original framework identified five core areas: patterns and controls of primary production, the distribution of populations, movements of organic matter, movements of inorganic nutrients, and patterns and frequencies of disturbance.

The Long Term Ecological Research Network connected the participating United States sites and encouraged comparative research, data sharing and synthesis across ecosystems. The International Long Term Ecological Research Network was formally established in 1993, initially bringing together representatives of national research programmes and existing study sites.

European programmes later developed the concept of long-term socio-ecological research, extending site-based ecosystem studies to larger areas studied through landscape ecology and incorporating human activities and institutions. Networks have also been established in Australia, China, South Africa and other regions.

== Research design and methods ==
=== Repeated observation ===
Long-term observational studies repeatedly measure the same variables using documented procedures. Depending on the subject, measurements may include population size, survival, reproductive success, species composition, vegetation, water chemistry, nutrient cycling, temperature or the timing of seasonal events. The resulting records can be used to distinguish sustained ecological change from short-term fluctuations and to investigate processes operating over extended periods.

In studies of animal populations, researchers may identify individuals using rings, tags, natural markings or electronic identifiers. Repeated observations of the same animals can connect survival and reproduction at different stages of life, reveal changes in age and social structure, and link individuals across generations. Permanent vegetation plots, regular censuses and repeated sampling of soil or water serve comparable purposes in studies of communities and ecosystems.

Comparisons through time depend on consistency in the variables measured, the timing and location of sampling and the definitions used. Changes in observers, instruments or procedures can otherwise create apparent trends that do not represent biological change. Long-term programmes therefore commonly preserve written protocols, information about sampling effort and records of methodological changes alongside the observations themselves.

=== Long-term experiments ===
Some studies maintain experimental treatments for years or decades. Permanent plots or study areas may receive different amounts of fertiliser, grazing, irrigation, burning, nutrient enrichment or atmospheric pollutants, while untreated areas serve as controls. Maintaining treatments over extended periods can reveal delayed effects, changing responses and ecological processes that would not become apparent during a short experiment.

Long-term experiments may also acquire scientific purposes different from those for which they were established. New investigators can apply additional measurements or use the continuing treatments to address questions that were not anticipated in the original design. The Park Grass Experiment, for example, began as an agricultural trial but later became a source of evidence about plant competition, biodiversity, soil chemistry, pollution and evolutionary change.

=== Individual-based studies ===
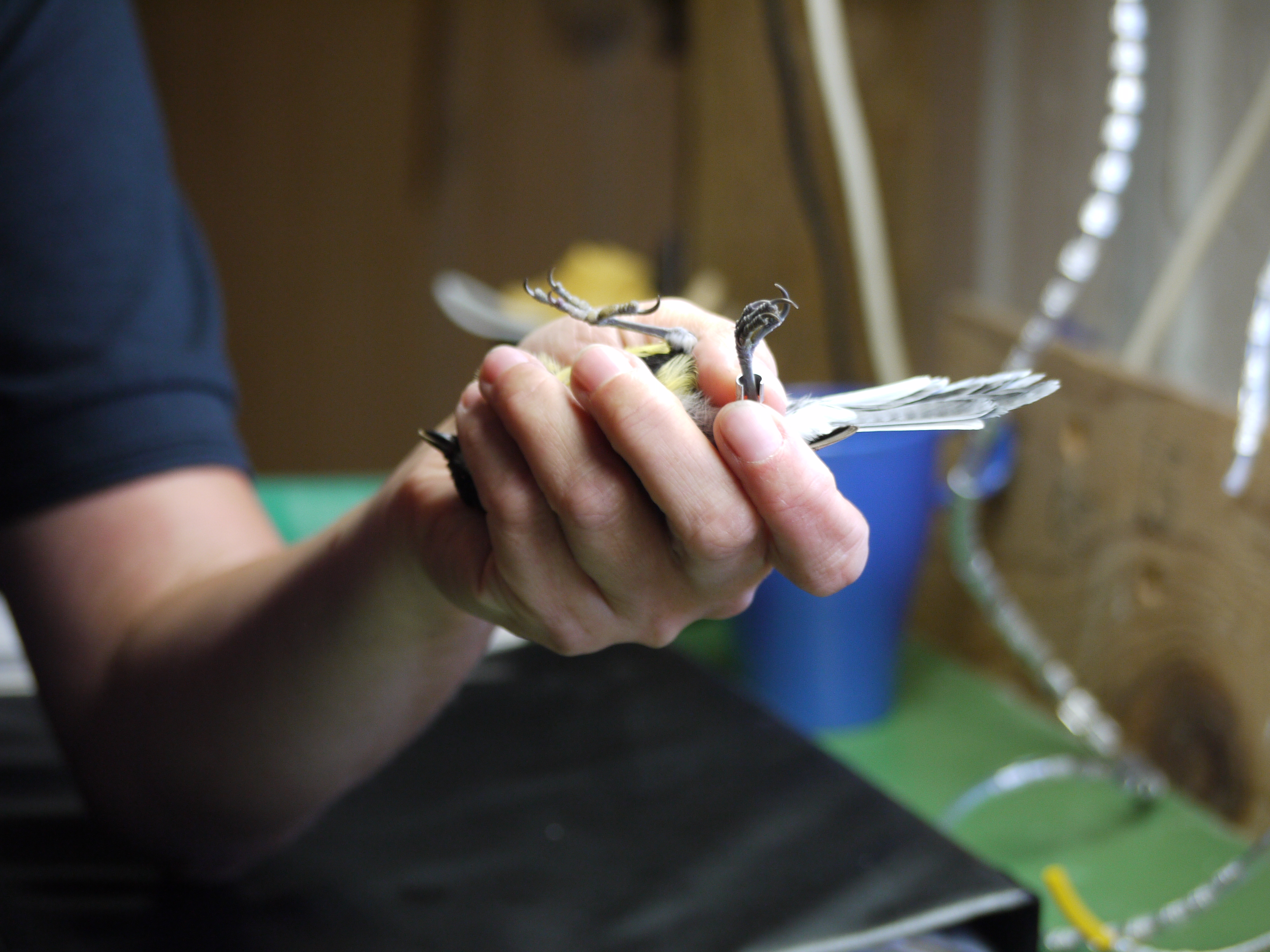
A great tit being ringed at Landsort Bird Observatory in Sweden. Bird ringing is one method used to identify individual animals over long periods.

Individual-based research follows identifiable organisms through part or all of their lives. It can relate differences in behaviour, physiology and reproductive success to survival and lifetime reproductive output. Records extending across generations may also allow researchers to investigate age structure, social relationships, heritability, natural selection and links between ecological and evolutionary change.

Such programmes are particularly feasible when organisms can be marked reliably, return to predictable breeding or feeding sites, or remain within a defined study area. Their continuation requires sustained effort to maintain identification systems, relocate marked individuals and preserve consistent records across successive generations of researchers.

=== Cross-site comparison and synthesis ===
Networks of study sites allow researchers to assess whether a process observed in one location or ecosystem is also found elsewhere. Comparative studies may combine observations or experiments from forests, grasslands, deserts, fresh waters, oceans, agricultural land and cities, enabling ecological patterns to be examined across environmental gradients and at broader geographical scales.

Cross-site synthesis requires sufficiently comparable variables and detailed metadata explaining how each dataset was produced. Differences in sampling frequency, spatial scale, units and definitions must be identified before results can be combined. Long-term research networks therefore develop shared measurements, data standards and repositories, while retaining information about site-specific methods and environmental conditions.

=== Historical and archived evidence ===
Long-term datasets may be extended using historical maps, survey records, photographs, museum collections, herbarium specimens and archived biological or environmental samples. These materials can provide ecological baselines from before a formal study began and may allow past changes in species distributions, phenology or community composition to be reconstructed.

Historical evidence was often collected for purposes other than ecological research, and its geographical coverage, terminology or sampling methods may differ from those of modern observations. Such limitations must therefore be considered when historical and contemporary records are compared.

== Selected examples ==
The following projects illustrate different forms of long-term ecological research; the list is not exhaustive.

Study	Location	Began	Principal subject	Type of study
Park Grass Experiment	Hertfordshire, England	1856	Effects of fertilisation and soil conditions on grassland	Long-term field experiment
Continuous Plankton Recorder Survey	North Atlantic, North Sea and other ocean basins	1931	Long-term changes in plankton communities and the marine environment	Standardised, large-scale marine monitoring survey
Lance Richdale's yellow-eyed penguin study	Otago Peninsula, New Zealand	1936	Demography, reproduction, survival and life histories of yellow-eyed penguins	Long-term individual-based seabird study
Wytham Tit Project	Oxfordshire, England	1947	Population ecology, behaviour and evolution of woodland tits	Individual-based population study
Isle Royale Wolf–Moose Project	Michigan, United States	1958	Predator–prey dynamics	Population monitoring and field research
Gombe chimpanzee study	Gombe Stream National Park, Tanzania	1960	Behaviour, demography and social ecology of wild chimpanzees	Long-term individual-based primate field study
Hubbard Brook Ecosystem Study	New Hampshire, United States	1963	Hydrology, nutrient cycling and forest ecosystems	Watershed-scale observation and experiment
Lynn Rogers' Minnesota black bear study	Northeastern Minnesota, United States	1969	Behaviour, ecology and life histories of wild American black bears	Long-term individual-based mammal field study
Amboseli Baboon Research Project	Amboseli ecosystem, southern Kenya	1971	Behaviour, demography and life histories of wild baboons	Long-term individual-based field study
Skomer guillemot study	Pembrokeshire, Wales	1972	Population biology and behaviour of common guillemots	Individual-based seabird study
Ai Project	Primate Research Institute, Inuyama, Japan	1978	Perception, memory and cognitive abilities of chimpanzees	Long-term experimental study of primate cognition
Biological Dynamics of Forest Fragments Project	Amazon rainforest near Manaus, Brazil	1979	Effects of habitat fragmentation on tropical-forest organisms and ecosystem processes	Landscape-scale field experiment and long-term ecosystem study
Cedar Creek LTER experiments	Minnesota, United States	1982	Effects of nutrient enrichment, disturbance and biodiversity on grassland and savanna ecosystems	Long-term field experiments and ecosystem research
Central Finland black grouse study	Central Finland	1987	Sexual selection, lekking behaviour, life histories and population ecology of black grouse	Long-term individual-based behavioural and evolutionary ecology study
Ellesmere Island wolf study	Ellesmere Island, Nunavut, Canada	1986	Demography, behaviour and predator–prey ecology of Arctic Wolves	Long-term individual- and pack-based field study
Sable Island Horse Project	Sable Island, Nova Scotia, Canada	2007	Population dynamics, behaviour, life histories and ecology of feral horses	Long-term individual-based population study

=== Related long-term biological studies ===
Related long-term studies in animal cognition and comparative psychology share some methodological features with long-term ecological research but do not necessarily constitute ecological studies. A notable example is the work of animal psychologist Irene Pepperberg with Alex, an African grey parrot acquired in 1977. Pepperberg studied Alex continuously for approximately thirty years, until his death in 2007, using repeated experiments to investigate vocal communication, numerical competence, categorisation and other cognitive abilities. The study produced a series of experiments conducted with the same individual across much of his lifespan and became influential in research on avian cognition.

== Scientific value ==
=== Baselines and long-term trends ===
Long-running observations provide baselines against which later ecological change can be measured. They can reveal gradual shifts in abundance, geographical distribution, community composition, breeding time or ecosystem chemistry that might be obscured by year-to-year variation.

The duration of a study can also alter the interpretation of a trend. A decline measured over several years may represent part of a longer population cycle, whereas an apparently stable short period may occur within a sustained decline. Long records help researchers distinguish directional change from natural variability.

=== Rare events, cycles and delayed responses ===
Ecologically important events such as severe droughts, storms, fires, epidemics and unusually cold winters may occur too infrequently to be represented in a short project. A study maintained over decades may record several such disturbances and compare their effects.

Long-term research can also detect thresholds, delayed responses and time lags. The effects of habitat alteration or pollution may not become visible until years after the original disturbance, while populations may continue changing after the environmental cause has diminished.

=== Ecological and evolutionary processes ===
Many ecological and evolutionary processes operate simultaneously. Long-term individual records permit researchers to examine how environmental variation affects survival and reproduction, and whether populations respond through behavioural flexibility, changes in population structure or genetic evolution.

Long-term research can therefore connect population ecology with evolutionary ecology, life-history theory, behaviour and genetics. Networks initially designed for ecosystem research have increasingly also been used to investigate evolutionary responses to environmental change.

=== Conservation and environmental management ===
Long-term data are used in conservation biology to assess population status, identify causes of decline and evaluate the effects of management. They can show whether apparent recovery represents a sustained demographic improvement and whether a conservation intervention has produced results beyond short-term variation.

Extended records also contribute to the assessment of climate change, pollution, land-use change, invasive species and biodiversity loss. Their value for policy depends on the relevance of the variables measured, the reliability of the methods and the extent to which the study sites represent wider environments.

== Data management ==
The usefulness of long-term data depends on their preservation and documentation. Earlier projects often relied on notebooks, card indexes and locally maintained files; contemporary studies increasingly use relational databases, digital repositories and persistent identifiers.

Data management commonly includes:

- recording sampling methods, units and changes in protocol;
- checking data for transcription errors and inconsistencies;
- retaining information about observers, instruments and sampling effort;
- preserving original and corrected versions of records;
- linking datasets to publications and specimen collections; and
- making data available as reusable data where ethical and legal constraints permit.

The United States LTER Network assigns information managers to participating sites and deposits data in repositories such as the Environmental Data Initiative. Documented and openly available records can be reused for questions that were not anticipated when the observations were originally collected.

For long-term studies of individually marked birds, the SPI-Birds Network and Database provides a way of preserving and sharing the data collected by different research groups. SPI-Birds brings together information from long-running studies of wild bird populations and helps researchers store the data in a consistent form, making it easier to find and use in later research. SPI-Birds was developed as a grassroots initiative, bringing together researchers from different countries in a collaborative and decentralised network. Participating research groups retain control over their own data while contributing to common practices that make it easier to share information and undertake research across different long-term studies.

Data concerning threatened species, private land or identifiable people may require restricted access. Long-term studies must also preserve the connection between a dataset and the contextual knowledge held by researchers and fieldworkers.

== Challenges ==
=== Funding and continuity ===
Long-term studies are difficult to sustain within systems of research funding in which grants, student projects and academic appointments usually last only a few years. Funding interruptions may cause the loss of an entire breeding season or break a continuous environmental record. Early advocates of long-term ecological research identified this mismatch between the duration of ecological processes and short funding cycles as a central problem.

Projects may depend heavily on individual researchers, temporary staff, volunteers or the goodwill of host institutions. Retirement, changes in institutional priorities and the loss of access to a study site can threaten continuity even when the resulting dataset has recognised scientific value.

=== Consistency and methodological change ===
Maintaining identical methods aids comparison through time, but strict consistency can become inappropriate when organisms, environments or technologies change. Sampling dates may cease to represent the same biological stage, instruments may become obsolete, and new methods may measure variables more accurately.

Changes in method can themselves affect apparent trends. One of the challenges researchers must contend with is therefore to try to balance continuity with methodological improvement. When protocols change, periods of overlap, calibration experiments and detailed documentation can help determine whether results obtained by old and new methods remain comparable.

=== Personnel and institutional memory ===
By definition, it is not uncommon for long-term projects to outlast the careers of their founders. Their institutional memory, including knowledge of field sites, unusual observations and earlier methodological decisions, can be at risk to be lost when responsibility passes to later researchers. Analyses of institutionalised long-term monitoring programmes have emphasised documented protocols, archives, staff training and organisational support that distributes responsibility beyond a single investigator. Long-term studies can also function as collaborative research platforms, giving later investigators and students access to established datasets, infrastructure and experienced collaborators.

=== Spatial and taxonomic limitations ===
A long record from one site does not necessarily represent other ecosystems. Study locations are often selected because they are accessible, protected or close to research institutions, which may introduce geographical bias.

Ecological field studies also tend to trade duration against spatial extent and sampling frequency. An analysis of modern ecological research found that observations continued to occupy relatively narrow spatial and temporal domains despite technological advances. Cross-site networks, remote sensing and coordinated monitoring can broaden coverage, but they do not remove the need for detailed local studies.

== Research networks and infrastructures ==
The United States Long Term Ecological Research Network consists of site-based research programmes representing terrestrial, freshwater, marine, polar, agricultural and urban ecosystems. Participating sites conduct locally designed research while contributing to cross-site comparisons and shared data infrastructure.

The International Long Term Ecological Research Network serves as an umbrella for national and regional networks. Its stated focus is long-term, site-based ecosystem, biodiversity, critical zone and socio-ecological research.

European Long-Term Ecosystem Research includes both relatively bounded ecosystem research sites and larger long-term socio-ecological research platforms. The latter incorporate multiple habitats, forms of land use and groups of human participants within a defined region.

Other large-scale environmental infrastructures, including the National Ecological Observatory Network in the United States, use standardised observations across numerous sites. Such observatories differ from many investigator-led long-term studies by prescribing common measurements over broad geographical areas.

== See also ==
- Citizen science
- Ecological forecasting
- Ecological indicator
- Environmental monitoring
- Historical ecology
- Long Term Ecological Research Network
- Long-Term Agroecosystem Research Network
- National Ecological Observatory Network
- Population viability analysis
- Time series
