= LTAR =

LTAR may refer to:

- Sivas Airport (ICAO airport code LTAR), Sivas, Turkiye
- Long-Term Agroecosystem Research Network (LTAR), a U.S. long-term research project for the sustainability of agriculture
- long-term acceptance rate (LTAR), for the water absorption rate of soil; see percolation test

== See also ==
- Itar (disambiguation)
