= Jornada Biosphere Reserve =

- Jornada Experimental Range
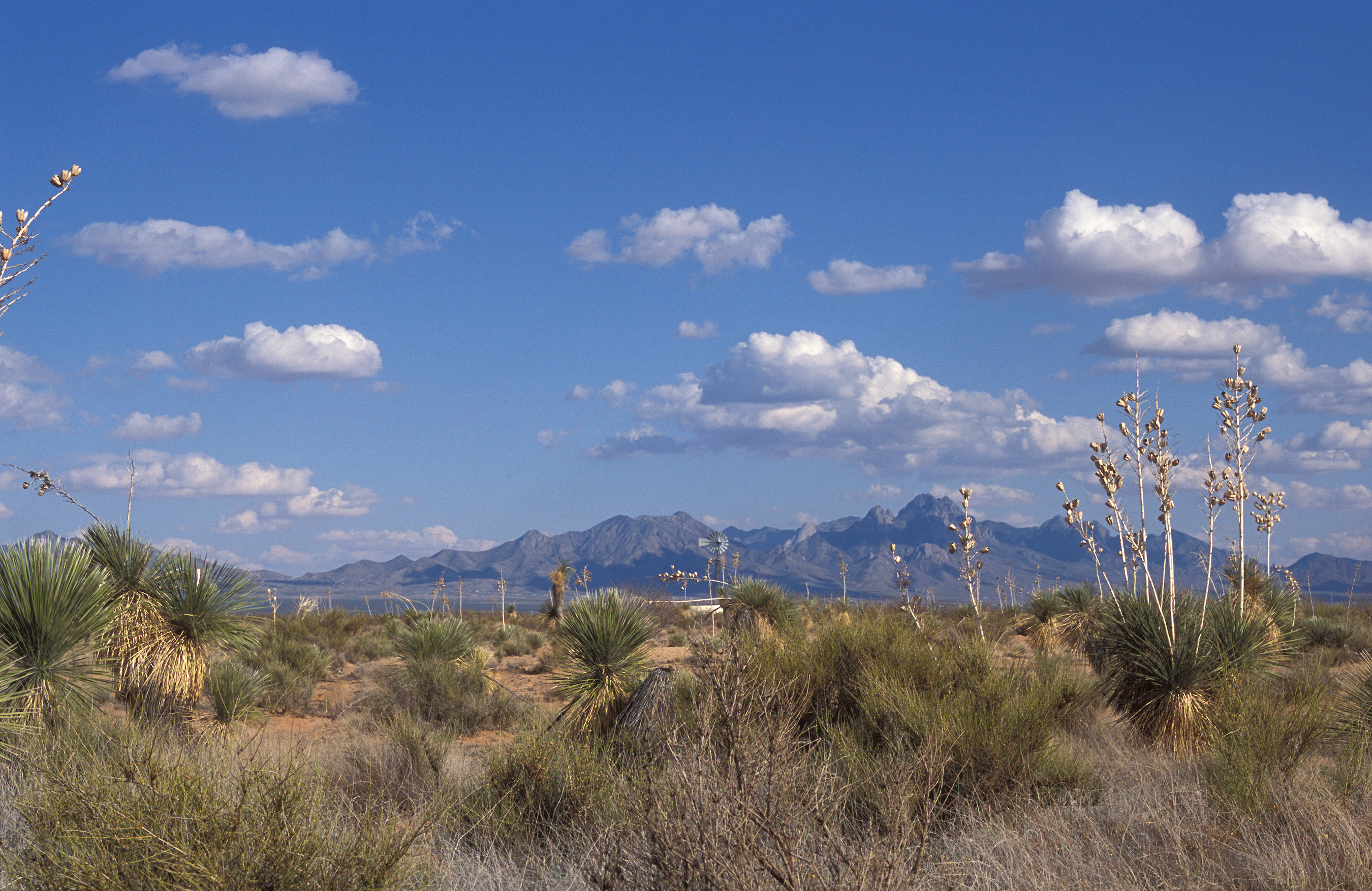
- Grassland-shrub savanna at the Jornada

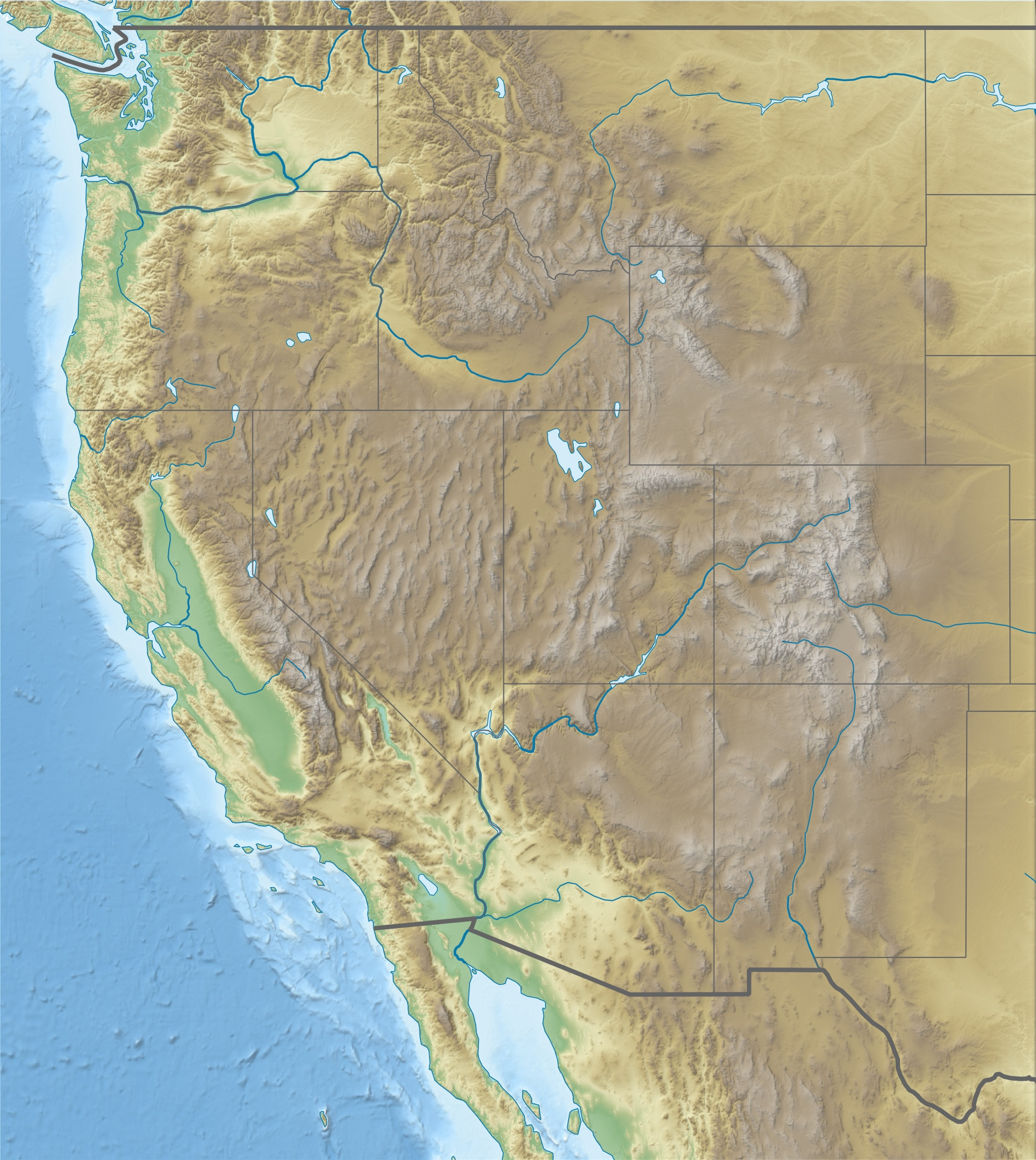
- Location within USA West
- Location: New Mexico, USA
- Nearest city: Las Cruces, New Mexico
- Coordinates: 32°37′N 106°45′W
- Area: 78,297 hectares (302.31 sq mi)
- Established: 1976
- Governing body: Jornada Experimental Range, U.S. Department of Agriculture, Agricultural Research Service

The Jornada Biosphere Reserve (established 1976) is a UNESCO Biosphere Reserve in southern New Mexico. It is one of three biosphere reserves representing the Chihuahuan Desert (along with Big Bend Biosphere Reserve and National Park in western Texas and Mapimí Biosphere Reserve in Mexico). The area extends from the crest of the San Andres Mountains, which are dominated by shrub woodlands, to the Jornada Plains characterized by semi-desert grasslands.

All three biosphere reserves in the Chihuahuan Desert are located in areas traditionally dominated by a livestock raising economy. Today, they face a variety of resource management issues relating to the sustainable development in desert ecosystems. Problems are associated with grazing of livestock, air pollution, and water quality, poaching of plants and animals, and loss of habitats.

The 78,297 hectares (302.31 sq mi) Jornada Biosphere Reserve encompasses the Jornada Experimental Range of the United States Department of Agriculture's Agricultural Research Service, established in 1912. While in a rural area, it is becoming more and more influenced by the urban economies of Las Cruces, New Mexico and El Paso, Texas. It focuses on long-term experimental research directed toward range management and maintenance of healthy desert ecosystems.

In nominating three biosphere reserves in the Chihuahuan Desert it was expected that cooperation would develop the knowledge and skills needed to manage the ecosystems of the Chihuahuan Desert for conservation and sustainable economic uses. Today, mainly research and environmental education projects characterize this cooperation.

== History ==
The Jornada was established from withdrawn public domain lands by Presidential Executive Order #1526 signed by President William H. Taft five months after New Mexico was granted statehood in early 1912. Originally named the Jornada Range Reserve, the facility was established within the Bureau of Plant Industry of the USDA, but transferred to the United States Forest Service (USFS) in 1915. The USFS quickly established a research program to address the principal objectives cited in the 1912 Executive Order including: 1) quantifying carrying capacity of native rangeland for livestock use, 2) establish a system of forage utilization consistent with growth requirements of desert forage plants, and 3) examine the possibility of rangeland improvements by introduction of new plants, seed planting, and conservation of runoff. These objectives were seen as critical to addressing the wide spread problems of rangeland degradation that had been documented across the American southwest at the end of the 19th century.

In 1952 the Jornada was transferred to the then newly created Agricultural Research Service (ARS). The ARS expanded the research program from its more narrow beginnings to one with national and international significance for land and its conservation and management. Research during the past century is effectively categorized into six principal themes: plant and landscape ecology, ecosystem sciences, rangeland management, land monitoring and assessment strategies, rangeland improvements, and rangeland livestock production and husbandry.

The Jornada was named a UNESCO Biosphere Reserve in 1976, was named one of the original cohorts of Long Term Ecological Research (LTER) sites in 1982, and was designated a relocatable site within the new National Ecological Observatory Network (NEON) in 2012.

Research and administration of the reserve is conducted at a 29,000-square-foot laboratory-and-office facility, on the campus of New Mexico State University (NMSU).

== Sources ==
This article incorporates text from a free content work (license statement/permission). Text taken from UNESCO - MAB Biosphere Reserves Directory, UNESCO, UNESCO.
