= National Ecological Observatory Network =

Organization providing ecological data in the United States

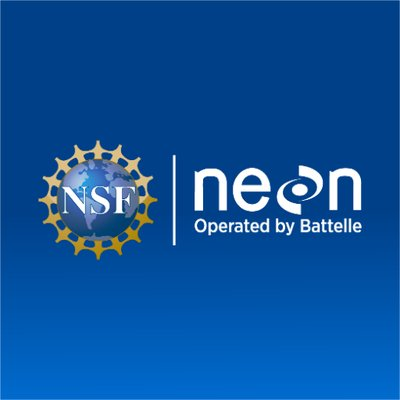
- Abbreviation: NEON
- Type: Nonprofit organization
- Purpose: Ecological monitoring
- Headquarters: Boulder, Colorado
- Region served: United States
- Website: www.neonscience.org

National Ecological Observatory Network (NEON) is a facility program operated by Battelle Memorial Institute and funded by the National Science Foundation (NSF). In full operation since 2019, NEON gathers and provides long-term, standardized data on ecological responses of the biosphere to changes in land use and climate, and on feedback with the geosphere, hydrosphere, and atmosphere. NEON is a continental-scale research platform for understanding how and why our ecosystems are changing.

== Vision and mission ==
A short documentary demonstrating the goals of NEON

The vision for NEON is to guide global understanding and decisions in a changing environment with scientific information about continental-scale ecology through integrated observations, experiments and forecasts. NEON's mission is to design, implement and operate the first and foremost integrated continental‐scale scientific infrastructure to enable research, discovery and education about ecological change.

NEON collects ecological and climatic observations across the United States, including Alaska, Hawaii and Puerto Rico. The observatory is among the first to detect and enable forecasting of ecological change at continental scales over multiple decades. NEON has partitioned the United States into 20 ecoclimatic domains, each of which represents different regions of vegetation, landforms, climate, and ecosystem performance. Data is collected by field technicians and passive sensors at strategically selected sites within each domain and synthesized into information products that can be used to describe changes in the nation's ecosystem through space and time. NEON data products are freely available via a web portal.

== Purpose and function ==
=== Science ===
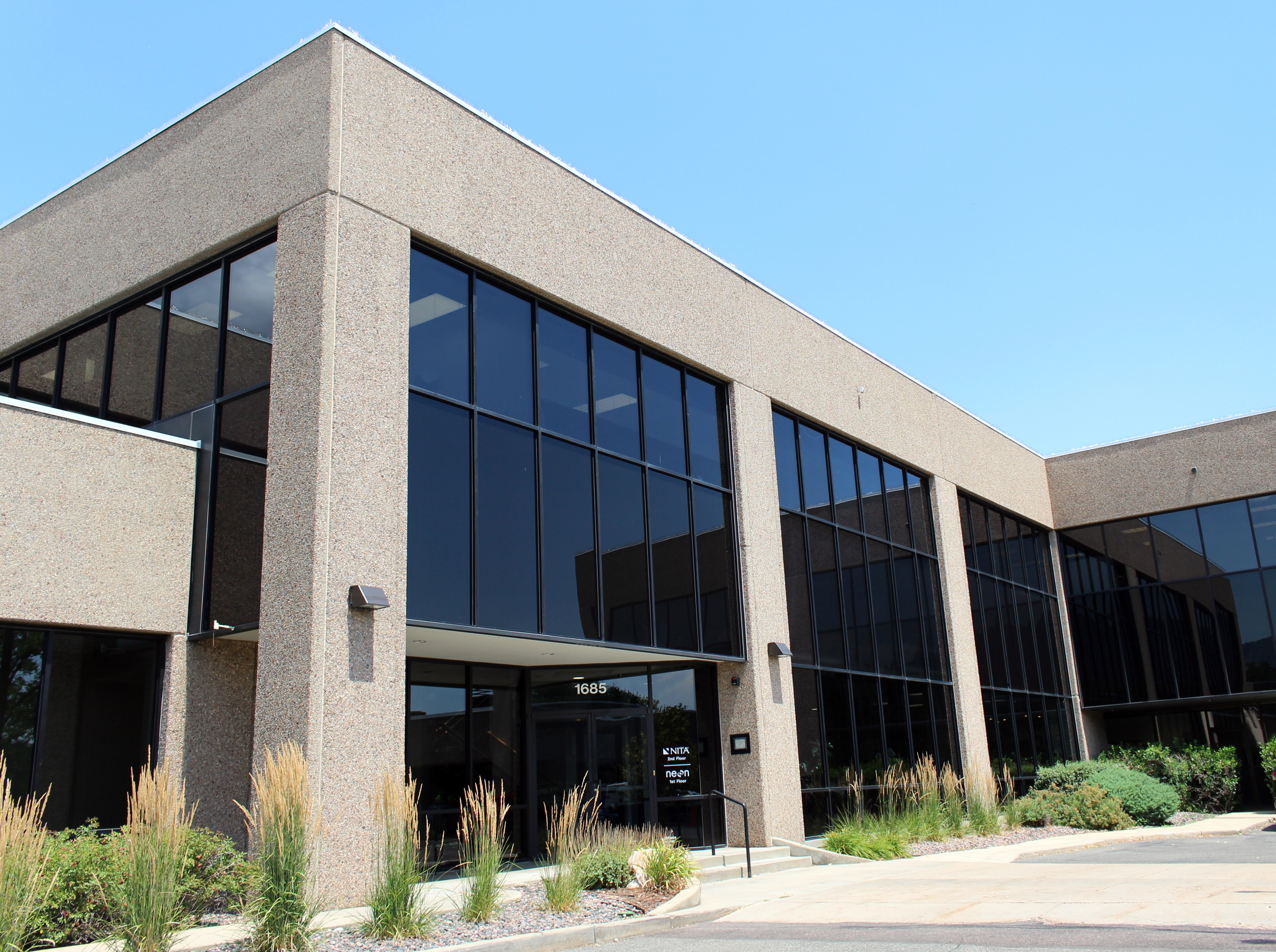
NEON headquarters in Boulder

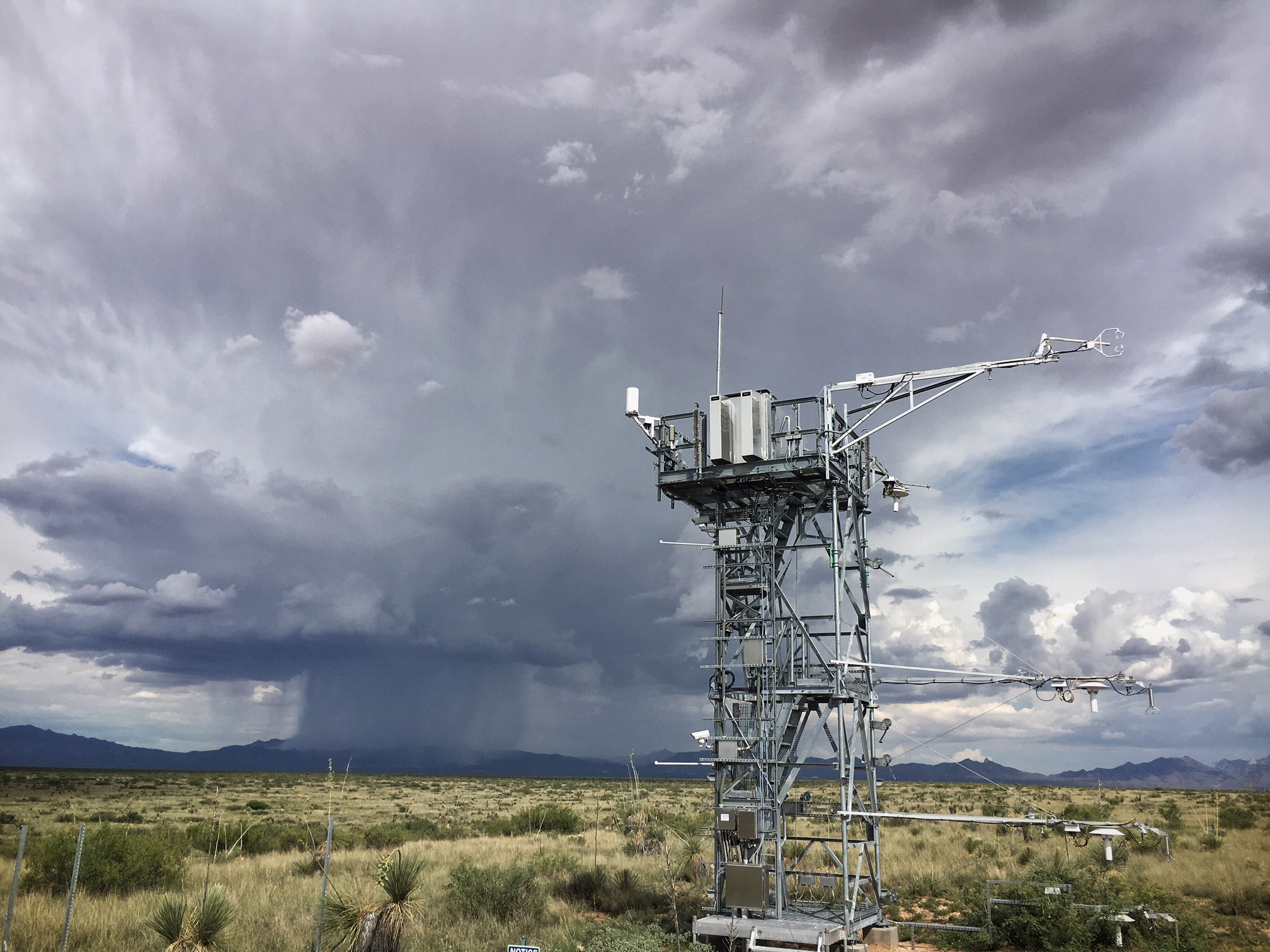
NEON tower at the Jornada Experimental Range

The data NEON collects are defined by a series of Grand Challenges, as identified by the National Research Council at the request of the National Science Foundation. The National Research Council established a committee to evaluate the major ecological, environmental, and national concerns that require a continental-scale observatory, and it identified the following Environmental Grand Challenges:

- Biogeochemistry: The study of how chemical, physical, geological, and biological processes combine to create the natural environment.
- Biodiversity: The full range of life forms on earth, or in a particular region.
- Climate change: A significant long-term change in the kind of weather we would expect based on averages calculated from climate data.
- Ecohydrology: The study of how organisms interact with their environment and with the constant movement of water.
- Infectious Diseases: Diseases spread by viruses, parasites, and bacteria that are sometimes transmitted to people by animals, birds, and insects.
- Land Use: The many ways that people change the natural landscape and environment, such as by building cities, cutting down forests, or planting crops.
- Invasive Species: Plants and organisms that overpopulate a particular place, or species that move into areas they have not lived in before.

Thus, the data and observations that NEON collects focuses on how land use, climate change and invasive species affect biodiversity, disease ecology, and ecosystem services. Obtaining integrated data on these relationships over a long-term period is crucial to improving forecast models and resource management for environmental change.

The National Science Foundation's vision for NEON is described as:

"A continental scale research instrument consisting of geographically distributed infrastructure, networked via state-of-the-art communications. Cutting-edge lab and field instrumentation, site-based experimental infrastructure, natural history archive facilities and/or computational, analytical and modeling capabilities, linked via a computational network will comprise NEON. NEON will transform ecological research by enabling studies on major environmental challenges at regional to continental scales. Scientists and engineers will use NEON to conduct real-time ecological studies spanning all levels of biological organization and temporal and geographical scales. NSF disciplinary and multi-disciplinary programs will support NEON research projects and educational activities. Data from standard measurements made using NEON will be publicly available.” (NSF 04549, 2004)

NEON is specifically designed to address central scientific questions about the interactions of ecosystems, climate, and land use:

- How will ecosystems and their components respond to changes in natural- and human-induced forcings such as climate, land use, and invasive species across a range of spatial and temporal scales? And, what is the pace and pattern of the responses?
- How do the internal responses and feedbacks of biogeochemistry, biodiversity, hydroecology, and biotic structure and function interact with changes in climate, land use, and invasive species? And, how do these feedbacks vary with ecological context and spatial and temporal scales?

=== Education ===
The data and information products that NEON collects and provides is readily available to scientists, educators, students, decision makers and the public to use to understand and address ecological questions and issues. Data is provided as meaningful information and learning tools that engage many audiences, including members of underserved communities, and promote broad ecological literacy.

== History ==
NEON was initially conceived in 2000, with a preliminary plan being developed in 2006. The National Science Foundation, the National Science Board and Congress approved funding for NEON in 2011. The program was fully operational in 2019.

Beginning in 2011, NEON, Inc., the entity in charge of initially running the NEON project, was audited by the Defense Contract Audit Agency on behalf of the National Science Foundation Office of the Inspector General. Auditor-in-Charge J. Kirk McGill determined that NEON, Inc. had poor control over taxpayer funds and could easily go over budget with little or no warning. He also found that NEON, Inc. had spent taxpayer funds on illegal expenditures including alcohol, lobbying, parties, and luxury travel. When McGill's findings were not addressed, he disclosed the matter directly to Congress. Hearings were held in 2014 and 2015. The House Committee on Science, Space, and Technology ultimately substantiated McGill's allegations, and NEON, Inc., was dismissed from the project. This represents one of the largest Federal agreement terminations for cause in history. The NSF chose Battelle to complete the construction of the observatory.

== Layout ==
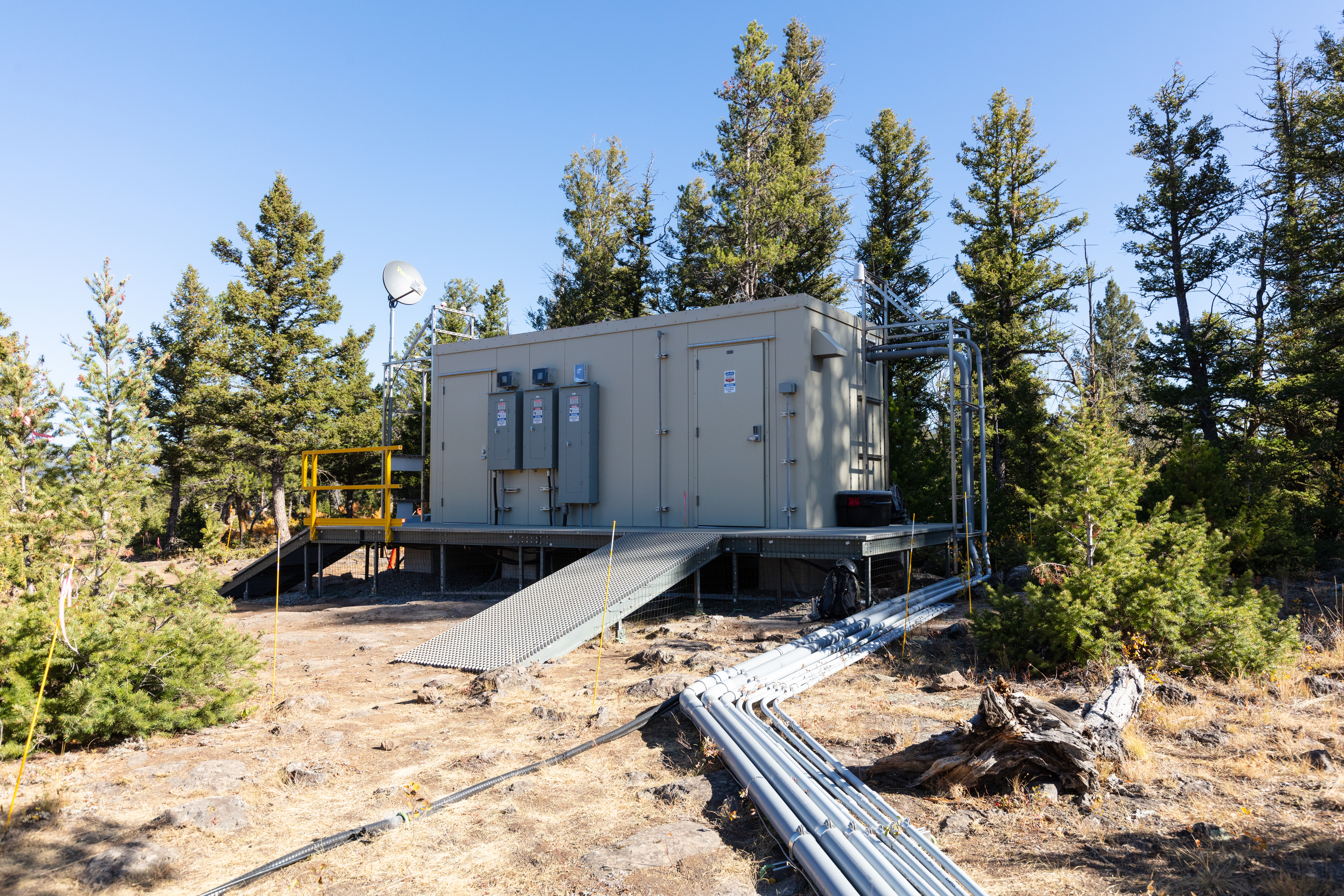
Instrumentation hut at Frog Rock, Yellowstone

NEON has categorized five types of measurement systems: the Airborne Observation Platform, Aquatic Instrument System, Aquatic Observation System, Terrestrial Instrument System, and Terrestrial Observation System.

=== Airborne observations ===
NEON takes airborne photography and performs aerial LiDAR observations of the sites being studied. This is accomplished by slow flying aircraft surveying at 1,000 meters above the ground.

=== Aquatic sites ===
Aquatic site sampling depends on the type of environment, varying between streams, rivers, and lakes. Automated sensors assess water quality and depth and manual observations study organisms, biogeochemistry, hydrology, and morphology.

=== Terrestrial sites ===
Each terrestrial site studied by NEON includes 30 randomly distributed plots. At select plots, technicians monitor soil biogeochemistry and microbes; plant diversity, biogeochemistry, biomass, productivity, and leaf area index; beetle diversity; mosquito prevalence, diversity, phenology, and infectious disease; small mammal diversity, demography, and disease; avian diversity; and tick‐borne diseases. Each terrestrial site is outfitted with soil sensor arrays and a tower mounted with sensory equipment. Towers are built to extend above the vegetation canopy and take measurements such as on air quality, carbon dioxide flux, temperature, and atmospheric pressure. Additional sampling plots are located within the airshed of the tower.

== Locations ==
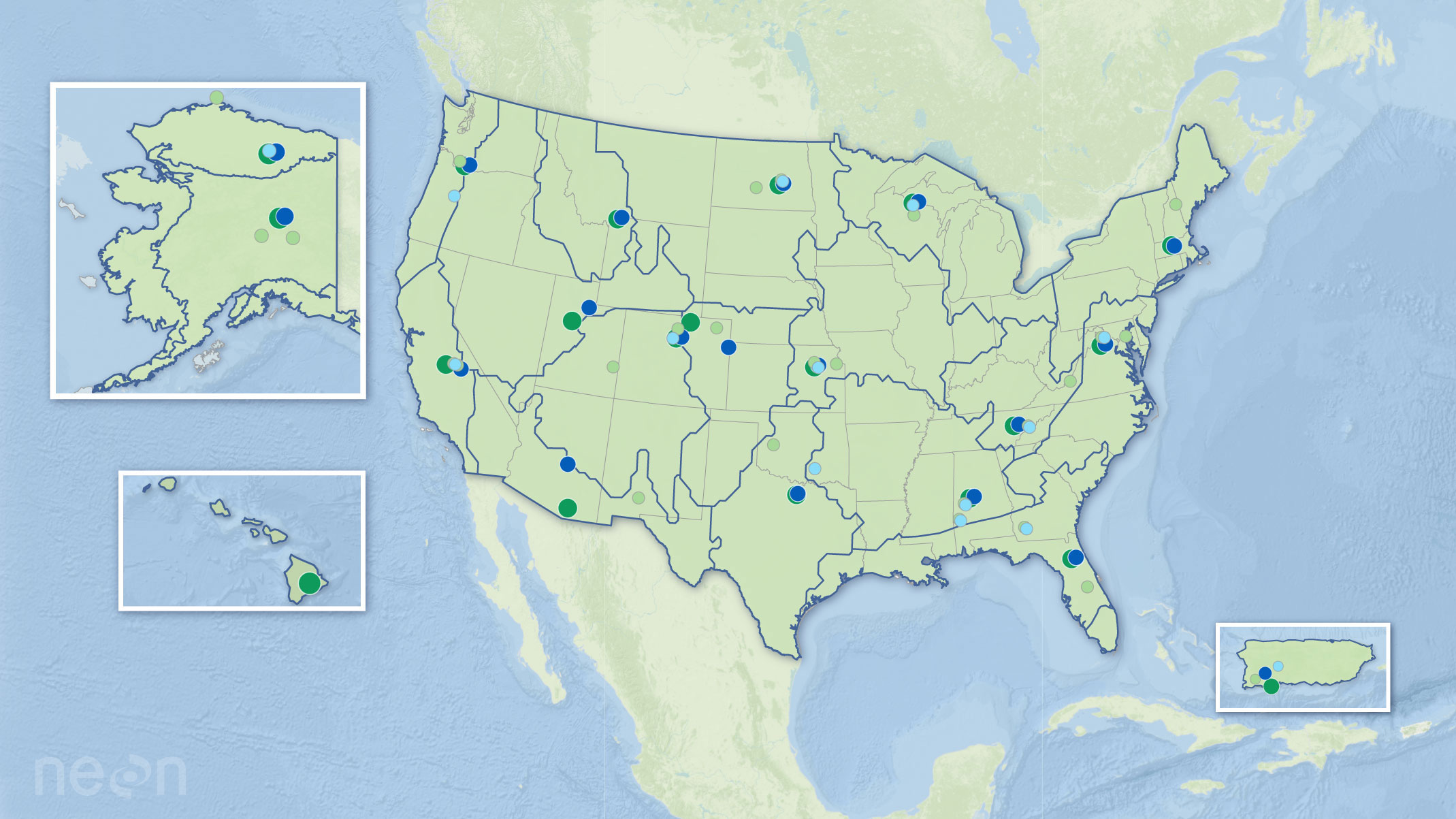
Map of established NEON sites

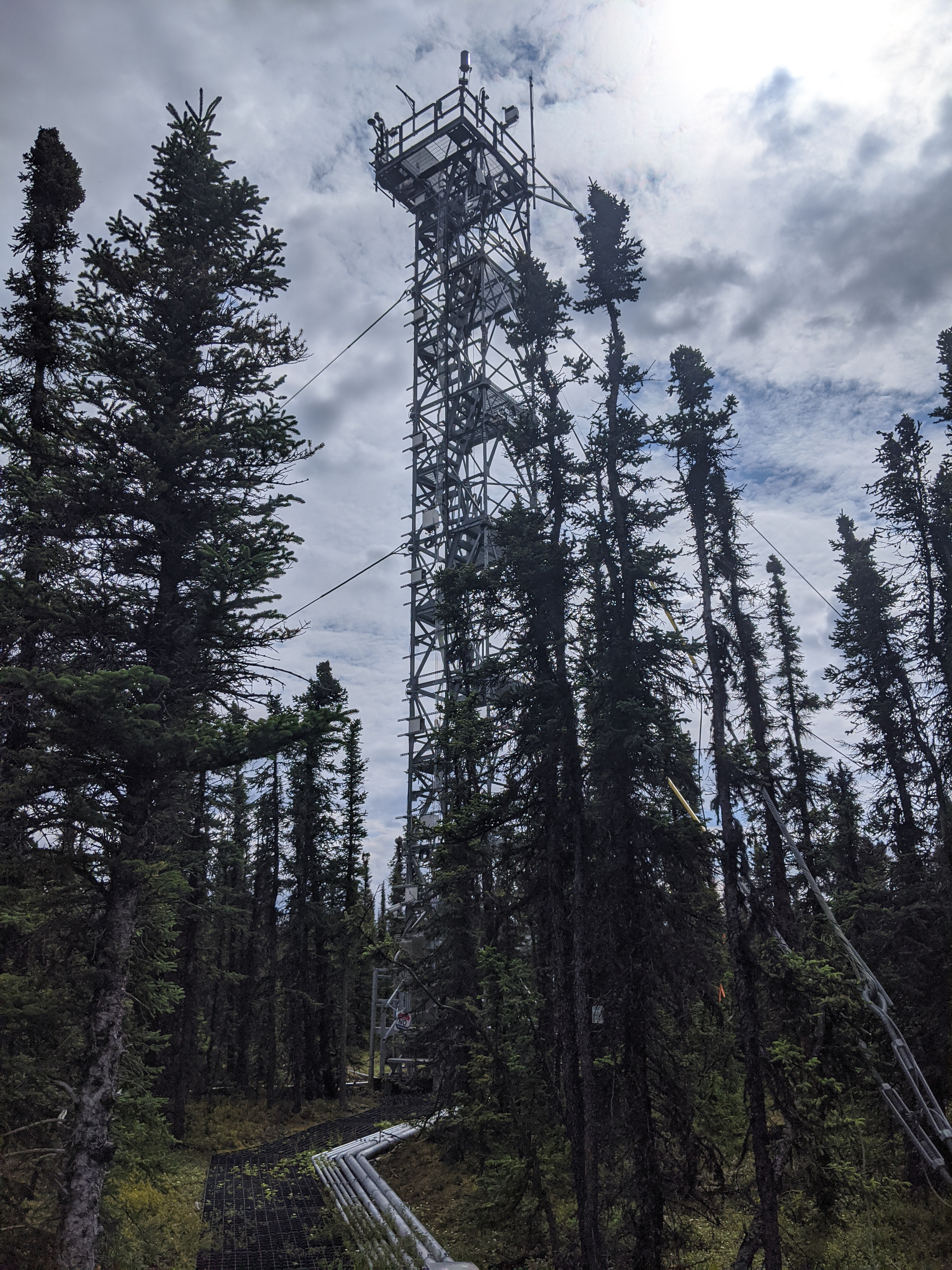
NEON tower in Delta Junction, Alaska

Sites are organized within 20 separate ecoclimatic domains throughout the United States. They are divided by terrestrial and aquatic sampling.

- Domain 1 encompasses the Northeast region and contains one aquatic and two terrestrial sites. The office is located in Fitchburg, Massachusetts.
  - Lower Hop Brook, a tributary of Quabbin Reservoir, Massachusetts
  - Harvard Forest, Massachusetts
  - Bartlett Experimental Forest, White Mountain National Forest, New Hampshire
- Domain 2 encompasses the Mid-Atlantic region and contains two aquatic and three terrestrial sites. The office is located in Front Royal, Virginia.
  - Posey Creek, Virginia
  - Lewis Run, Virginia
  - Blandy Experimental Farm, Virginia
  - Smithsonian Conservation Biology Institute, Virginia
  - Smithsonian Environmental Research Center, Maryland
- Domain 3 encompasses the Southeast region and contains three aquatic and three terrestrial sites. The office is located in Gainesville, Florida.
  - Lake Barco, Florida
  - Suggs Lake, Florida
  - Flint River, Georgia
  - Ordway-Swisher Biological Station, Florida
  - Disney Wilderness Preserve, Florida
  - Joseph W. Jones Ecological Research Center, Georgia
- Domain 4 studies the Atlantic neotropical region and contains two aquatic and two terrestrial sites. The office is located in Guanica, Puerto Rico.
  - Río Cupeyes, Puerto Rico
  - Río Yahuecas, Puerto Rico
  - Lajas Experimental Station, Lajas Research and Development Center, Puerto Rico
  - Guanica Forest, Puerto Rico
- Domain 5 studies the Great Lakes region and contains two aquatic and three terrestrial sites. The office is located in Land O' Lakes, Wisconsin.
  - Little Rock Lake, Wisconsin
  - Crampton Lake, Wisconsin
  - Treehaven, University of Wisconsin-Stevens Point, Wisconsin
  - Steigerwaldt Land Services, Park Falls District of the Chequamegon-Nicolet National Forest, Wisconsin
  - University of Notre Dame Environmental Research Center, Michigan
- Domain 6 encompasses the Prairie Peninsula and contains two aquatic and three terrestrial sites. The office is located in Manhattan, Kansas.
  - McDiffett Creek, Kansas
  - Kings Creek, Kansas
  - Konza Prairie Biological Station, Kansas (two sites)
  - The University of Kansas Field Station, Kansas
- Domain 7 encompasses the Appalachian Mountains and Cumberland Plateau and contains two aquatic and three terrestrial sites. The office is located in Oak Ridge, Tennessee.
  - LeConte Creek, Great Smoky Mountains National Park, Tennessee
  - Walker Branch, Tennessee
  - Mountain Lake Biological Station, University of Virginia, Virginia
  - Twin Creeks, Great Smoky Mountains National Park, Tennessee
  - Oak Ridge National Laboratory, Tennessee
- Domain 8 encompasses the Ozark region and contains three aquatic and three terrestrial sites. The office is located in Tuscaloosa, Alabama.
  - Black Warrior River, Alabama
  - Mayfield Creek, Alabama
  - Tombigbee River, Choctaw National Wildlife Refuge, Alabama
  - Dead Lake, Demopolis, Alabama
  - Lenoir Landing, Choctaw National Wildlife Refuge, Alabama
  - Talladega National Forest, Alabama
- Domain 9 encompasses the Northern plains region and contains two aquatic and three terrestrial sites. The office is located in Jamestown, North Dakota.
  - Prairie Lake, North Dakota
  - Prairie Pothole, North Dakota
  - Dakota Coteau Field School, Chase Lake National Wildlife Refuge, North Dakota
  - Woodworth Study Area, Chase Lake National Wildlife Refuge, North Dakota
  - Northern Great Plains Research Laboratory, North Dakota
- Domain 10 encompasses the Central plains region and contains one aquatic and three terrestrial sites. The office is located in Boulder, Colorado.
  - Arikaree River, Fox Ranch Preserve, Colorado
  - Rocky Mountain National Park, Colorado
  - North Sterling, Colorado
  - Central Plains Experimental Range, Pawnee National Grasslands, Colorado
- Domain 11 encompasses the Southern plains region and contains one aquatic and three terrestrial sites. The office is located in Denton, Texas.
  - Blue River, Oka' Yanahli Preserve, Oklahoma
  - Pringle Creek, Texas
  - Marvin Klemme Range Research Station, Oklahoma State University, Oklahoma
  - Lyndon B. Johnson National Grassland, Texas
- Domain 12 encompasses the Northern Rocky Mountains and contains one aquatic and one terrestrial site. The office is located in Bozeman, Montana.
  - Blacktail Deer Creek, Yellowstone National Park, Wyoming
  - Yellowstone Northern Range (Frog Rock), Yellowstone National Park, Wyoming
- Domain 13 encompasses the Southern Rocky Mountains and Colorado Plateau and contains two aquatic and two terrestrial sites. The office is located in Boulder, Colorado.
  - Como Creek, Colorado
  - West St. Louis Creek, Colorado
  - Moab, Utah
  - Niwot Ridge Mountain Research Station, Colorado
- Domain 14 encompasses the Desert Southwest and contains one aquatic and two terrestrial sites. The office is located in Tucson, Arizona.
  - Sycamore Creek, Arizona
  - Jornada Experimental Range, New Mexico
  - Santa Rita Experimental Range, Arizona
- Domain 15 encompasses the Great Basin and contains one aquatic and one terrestrial site. The office is located in South Salt Lake, Utah.
  - Red Butte Creek, Utah
  - Onaqui Mountains, Utah
- Domain 16 encompasses the Pacific Northwest and contains two aquatic and two terrestrial sites. The office is located in Vancouver, Washington.
  - McRae Creek, H.J. Andrews Experimental Forest, Oregon
  - Martha Creek, Washington
  - Wind River Experimental Forest, Washington
  - Abby Road, Yacolt Burn State Forest, Washington
- Domain 17 studies the Pacific Southwest and contains two aquatic and two terrestrial sites. The office is located in Fresno, California.
  - Upper Big Creek, California
  - Teakettle Creek, California
  - San Joaquin Experimental Range, California
  - Lower Teakettle, Sierra National Forest, California
  - Soaproot Saddle, Sierra National Forest, California
- Domain 18 studies the tundra and contains one aquatic and two terrestrial sites. The office is located in Fairbanks, Alaska.
  - Oksrukuyik Creek, Alaska
  - Toolik Field Station, Alaska
  - Utqiaġvik, Alaska
- Domain 19 studies the taiga and contains one aquatic and three terrestrial sites. The office is located in Fairbanks, Alaska.
  - Caribou Creek, Alaska
  - Caribou-Poker Creeks Research Watershed, Alaska
  - Delta Junction, Alaska
  - Healy, Alaska
- Domain 20 studies the Pacific tropical region and contains one terrestrial site. The office is located in Hilo, Hawaii.
  - Pu'u Maka'ala Natural Area Reserve, Hawaii

== See also ==
- Global Lake Ecological Observatory Network
- Long-Term Agroecosystem Research Network
- Long Term Ecological Research Network
