= Rachael Morgan-Kiss =

American professor of microbiology

- Education: University of Victoria, British Columbia (B.Sc.) University of Western Ontario, Ontario (PhD)
- Scientific career
- Fields: Microbiology
- Workplaces: University of Illinois, Urbana-Champaign Delaware Biotechnology Institute, University of Delaware Miami University
- Website: https://miamioh.edu/profiles/cas/rachael-morgan-kiss.html

Rachael Morgan-Kiss, an American microbiologist, is chair and the O'Toole Family Professor of the Department of Microbiology at Miami University. She is a Principal Investigator with the McMurdo Dry Valleys Long Term Ecological Research Project. Her research revolves mainly around how microorganisms are able to survive extremely high stress environments.

== Education ==
Kiss earned her B.Sc. in 1995 from the University of Victoria, British Columbia and a PhD from the University of Western Ontario, Ontario in 2000. Her PhD research focused on photosynthetic adaptation of a psychrophilic green alga that is found in an ice-covered lake located in the McMurdo Dry Valleys of Antarctica.

== Career and impact ==
After earning her PhD Kiss took a position as a postdoctoral fellow in the Department of Microbiology at the University of Illinois Urbana-Champaign, where she worked on bacterial fatty acid synthase and β-oxidation pathways. She then worked at the Delaware Biotechnology Institute, University of Delaware conducting research on the photobiology of a thermophilic green sulfur bacterium.

Following these earlier positions Kiss shifted her focus to towards extreme cold environments, laying the foundation for how photosynthetic microorganisms adapt to permanently frozen habitats in a 2006 review. Over the next decade she continued studying survival strategies of Antarctic microorganisms, investigating how they are able to survive long and dark polar nights. In 2015 her research provided key insights into how phytoplankton in permanently ice covered lakes successfully adapt to periods of prolonged darkness, with this line of research culminating in a 2024 study that detailed the exact molecular and biochemical survival strategies used by Antarctic diatoms to endure the polar winter.

Kiss's current research in Antarctica continues to focus on the physiological, molecular, and biochemical processes that allow microorganisms to survive in the uniquely harsh climate of Antarctica. Since Kiss' first expedition to Antarctica as a doctoral student she has completed over 20 years of field research based out of McMurdo Station. Her research on Antarctic microorganisms has been backed by the National Science Foundation since 2007 and she is currently a Principal Investigator in a multi-million dollar NSF grant that supports research documenting how McMurdo Dry Valley ecosystems respond to environmental change (McMurdo Dry Valleys LTER).

== Selected works ==
- Morgan-Kiss, Rachael M., and John E. Cronan. “The Lactococcus Lactis FabF Fatty Acid Synthetic Enzyme Can Functionally Replace Both the FabB and FabF Proteins of Escherichia Coli and the FabH Protein of Lactococcus Lactis.” Archives of Microbiology, vol. 190, no. 4, 4 June 2008, pp. 427–437, https://doi.org/10.1007/s00203-008-0390-6. Accessed 1 June 2026.
- Morgan-Kiss, Rachael M., et al. “Adaptation and Acclimation of Photosynthetic Microorganisms to Permanently Cold Environments.” Microbiology and Molecular Biology Reviews, vol. 70, no. 1, Mar. 2006, pp. 222–252, https://doi.org/10.1128/mmbr.70.1.222–252.2006.
- Morgan-Kiss, R. M., et al. “Photoadaptation to the Polar Night by Phytoplankton in a Permanently Ice-Covered Antarctic Lake.” Limnology and Oceanography, vol. 61, no. 1, 23 May 2015, pp. 3–13, https://doi.org/10.1002/lno.10107. Accessed 18 May 2021.
- Morgan‐Kiss, Rachael. “Long Days and Long Nights: An Integrative Study Reveals Survival Strategies of an Antarctic Diatom during the Cold and Dark Polar Winter.” New Phytologist, vol. 241, no. 5, 13 Jan. 2024, pp. 1885–1887, https://doi.org/10.1111/nph.19536. Accessed 9 May 2025.
