= Wytham Tit Project =

Long-term ornithological study in Oxfordshire

The Wytham Tit Project is a long-term ecological study of great tits (Parus major) and blue tits (Cyanistes caeruleus) in Wytham Woods, Oxfordshire. Established in 1947 by ornithologists John Gibb and David Lack, the project is operated by the Edward Grey Institute of Field Ornithology in the University of Oxford's Department of Biology.

The project has continuously recorded the breeding attempts of individually marked birds over successive generations. It is one of the world's longest-running individual-based studies of a wild animal population and has contributed to research in population biology, evolutionary ecology, responses to climate change, social behaviour and animal culture.

== History ==
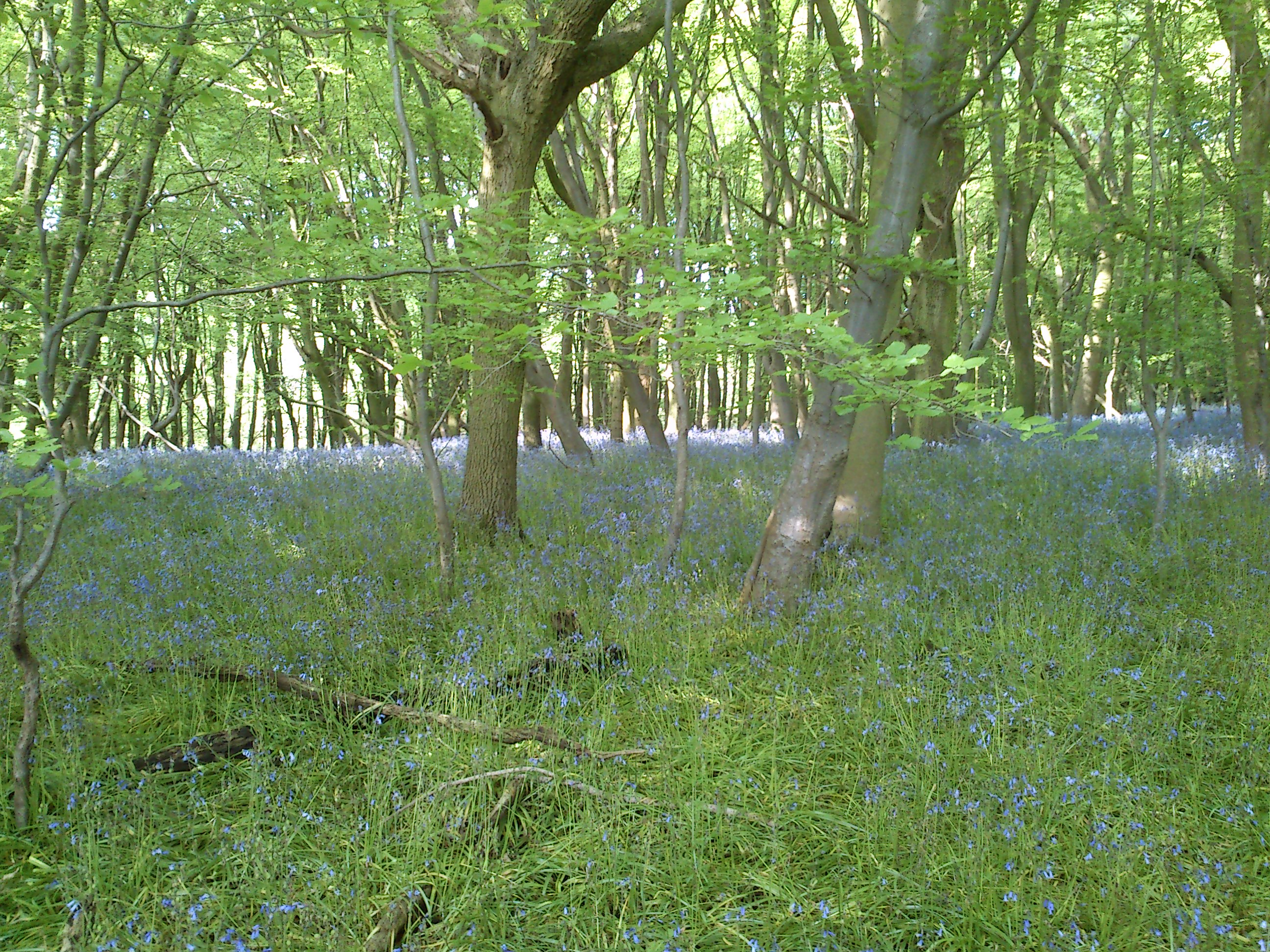
Wytham Woods in Oxfordshire, the field site of the Wytham Tit Project since 1947.

The study began on 27 April 1947, when the first great tit egg of that year's breeding season was recorded. Gibb and Lack established the project after joining the Edward Grey Institute following the Second World War. Their work was influenced by the earlier studies of Dutch ornithologist H. N. Kluyver on great tit population ecology.

The researchers initially installed 100 nest boxes in Marley Wood, one section of Wytham Woods. At about the beginning of the 1960s, the study was expanded to cover approximately 385 hectares of woodland using more than 1,000 nest boxes at fixed locations. Early research focused on the breeding biology and population dynamics of great tits, including the relationship between clutch size, food availability and the survival of offspring. The study was subsequently expanded to include blue tits and smaller populations of coal tits and marsh tits.

During the 1970s, ornithologist Euan Dunn used records from the project to compare laying dates among the four tit species monitored at Wytham and to investigate nest predation by least weasels in relation to the density of nesting tits and the abundance of rodents.

Chris Perrins became one of the principal researchers associated with the project during the second half of the twentieth century. The project was later led by Ben Sheldon, with research conducted by successive generations of students, fieldworkers and researchers at Oxford.

== Methods ==
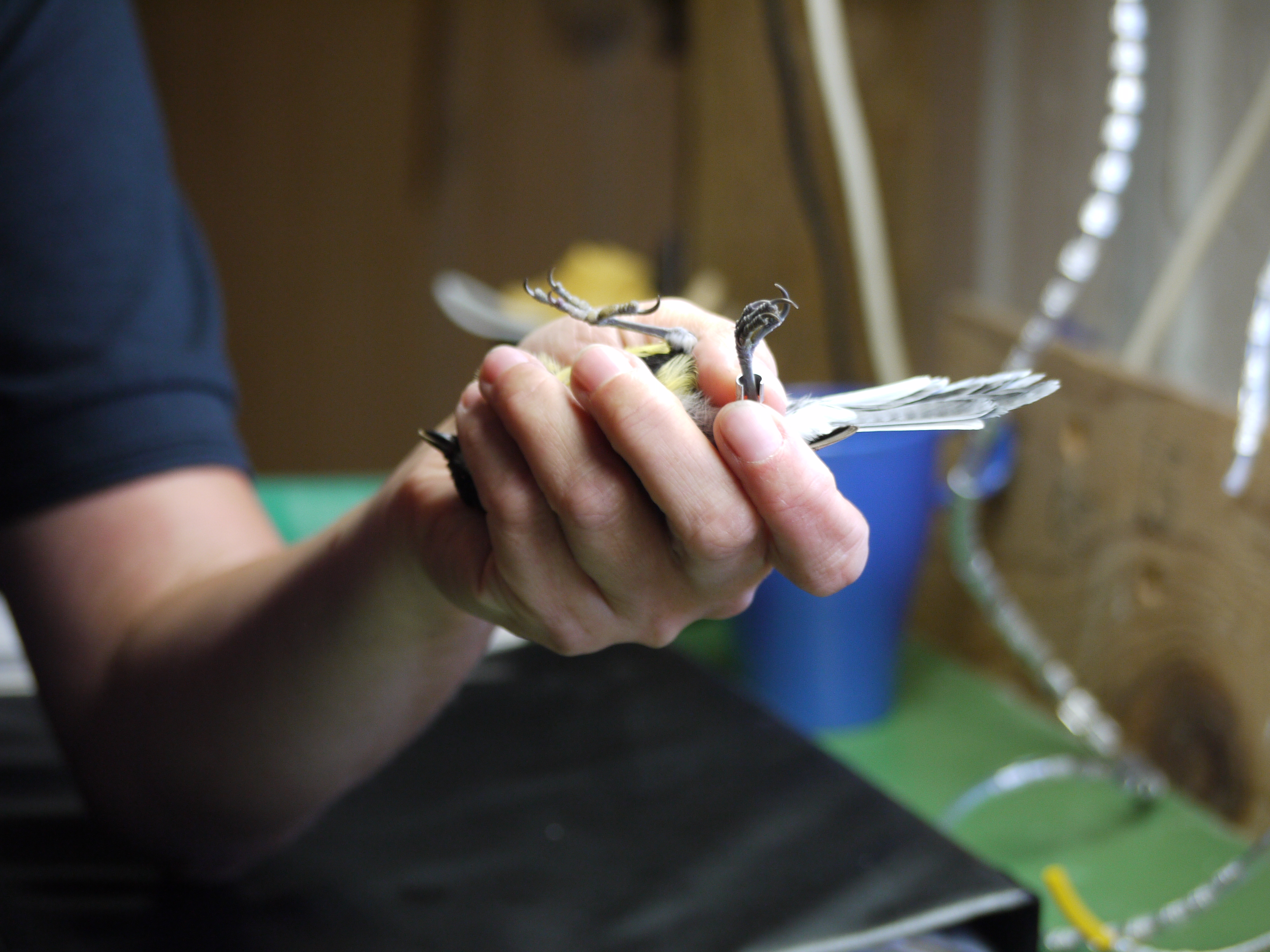
A great tit being fitted with an identification ring at a bird observatory in Sweden. Individually numbered rings are used at Wytham to follow birds throughout their lives.

Researchers record laying dates, clutch sizes, hatching dates, brood sizes and reproductive success. Parents and nestlings are fitted with individually numbered leg rings through bird ringing, enabling their survival, reproduction and movements to be followed in later years.

Great tits and blue tits readily breed in nest boxes, occur at relatively high densities and usually disperse only short distances from where they hatch. These characteristics allow large proportions of the population to be monitored throughout their lives.

More recent research has used radio-frequency identification (RFID) tags and automated readers attached to feeding stations. A network of feeders distributed across Wytham Woods records which tagged birds feed together, allowing researchers to use social network analysis to study the spread of information, behaviour and disease.

By 2026, records for great tits alone included more than 147,000 eggs and life-history information for over 114,000 individually marked birds. Pedigrees constructed from the data connected birds across as many as 35 generations.

== Scientific findings ==
=== Clutch size and population biology ===
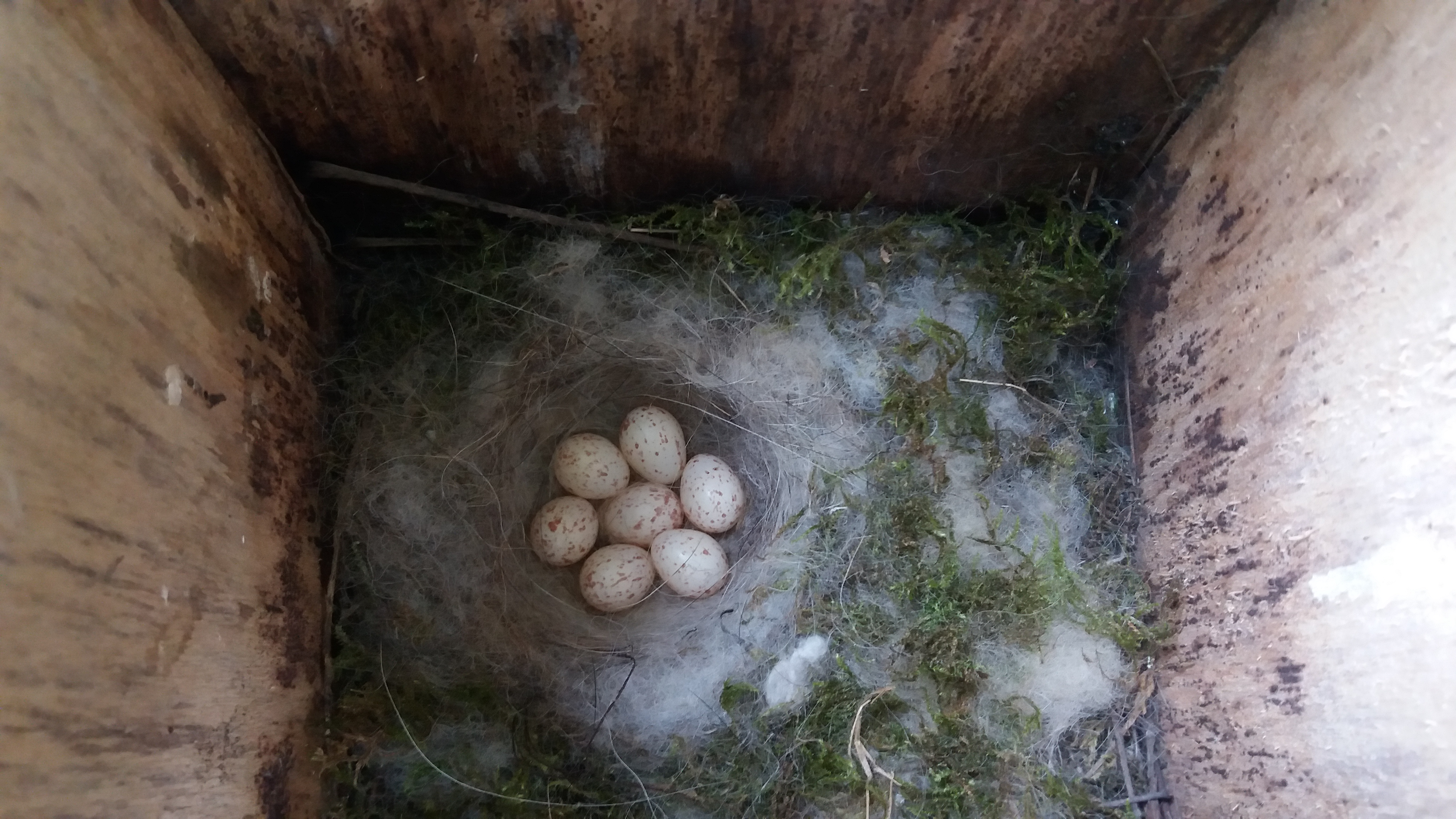
A clutch of great tit eggs in an artificial nest box. Long-term records of clutch size and breeding success are central to the Wytham study.

Early research at Wytham examined why birds lay a particular number of eggs and how brood size affects the survival of offspring. A study by Lack, Gibb and D. F. Owen found that the number of young surviving from a brood was generally greatest when great tits laid the clutch sizes most commonly observed in the population. The optimum varied between years according to environmental conditions and food availability.

Perrins subsequently analysed how population density, winter conditions, caterpillar abundance, female age and the timing of breeding affected clutch size and fluctuations in the Wytham great tit population.

=== Nest predation ===
Using records collected between 1947 and 1975, Dunn found that least weasels were the principal cause of nest failure among the tits breeding in Wytham's nest boxes, taking an average of 20.8 per cent of nests each year. The annual level of predation was related both to the density of nesting tits and to changes in rodent abundance.

=== Climate change and breeding time ===
Long-term records from Wytham have shown a substantial advance in great tit breeding dates. The first egg recorded in 1947 was laid on 27 April, whereas in 2026 the first egg was recorded on 23 March, the earliest date in the history of the study. By that year, the population's average laying date had advanced by 16 days since the 1960s.

A 2008 study using 47 years of Wytham data found that individual great tits adjusted their reproductive timing in response to environmental conditions. This phenotypic plasticity allowed the population to track changes in spring temperatures and the seasonal availability of caterpillar prey more rapidly than would have been possible through genetic evolution alone.

Research published in 2021 found substantial variation within Wytham Woods in the rate at which great tit laying dates had advanced. Birds nesting near healthier oak trees had shifted their breeding dates more than birds in areas containing less healthy trees, linking local responses to climate change with variation in woodland condition.

The long-term records have also been used to examine the effects of extreme climatic events. Episodes of unusually high or low temperatures and heavy rainfall affected reproductive success differently depending on when they occurred during the breeding cycle, with exposure to extreme cold producing the strongest negative effects.

=== Social learning and culture ===
Automated tracking of winter feeding flocks has enabled researchers to study social learning and how information travels through wild-bird social networks. In an experiment conducted in Wytham Woods, researchers trained a small number of great tits to open puzzle feeders using one of two alternative techniques. The locally introduced techniques spread through the birds' social networks and persisted as group-specific traditions, with birds tending to adopt the behaviour most frequently used by others.

=== Birdsong ===
A study published in 2025 used artificial intelligence to analyse more than 100,000 songs from great tits in Wytham Woods. It found that immigration, dispersal, population turnover and the age structure of neighbourhoods influenced song diversity and the rate at which local song traditions changed. Older birds preserved song types that had become less common, while immigrants adopted local songs but also increased the diversity of neighbourhood repertoires.

=== Disease ecology ===
Long-term monitoring enabled researchers to study the disease ecology of a severe form of avian pox after it reached Wytham Woods in 2009. Data from more than 8,000 captured birds showed infection in up to 10 per cent of great tits but in fewer than 1 per cent of five closely related species. Infection reduced survival and reproductive output, with particularly strong effects on juvenile survival.

== Scientific significance ==
The long duration of the study allows researchers to distinguish short-term fluctuations from longer-term changes in population size, reproductive behaviour and environmental conditions. The same individually marked population has been used to investigate ageing, inheritance, selection, dispersal, social organisation, disease transmission and biological responses to climate change.

The project has also provided a testing ground for new research methods, including genetic pedigree analysis, automated RFID monitoring, social network analysis, large-scale recording of bird vocalisations and machine learning analysis of birdsong.

== See also ==
- Great tit
- Blue tit
- Wytham Woods
- Edward Grey Institute of Field Ornithology
- Long-term ecological research
- Population ecology
