= Central Plains Biosphere Reserve =

- Central Plains Experimental Range
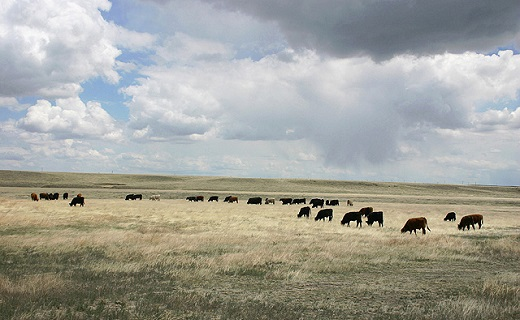
- Yearling steers grazing on an experimental research pasture

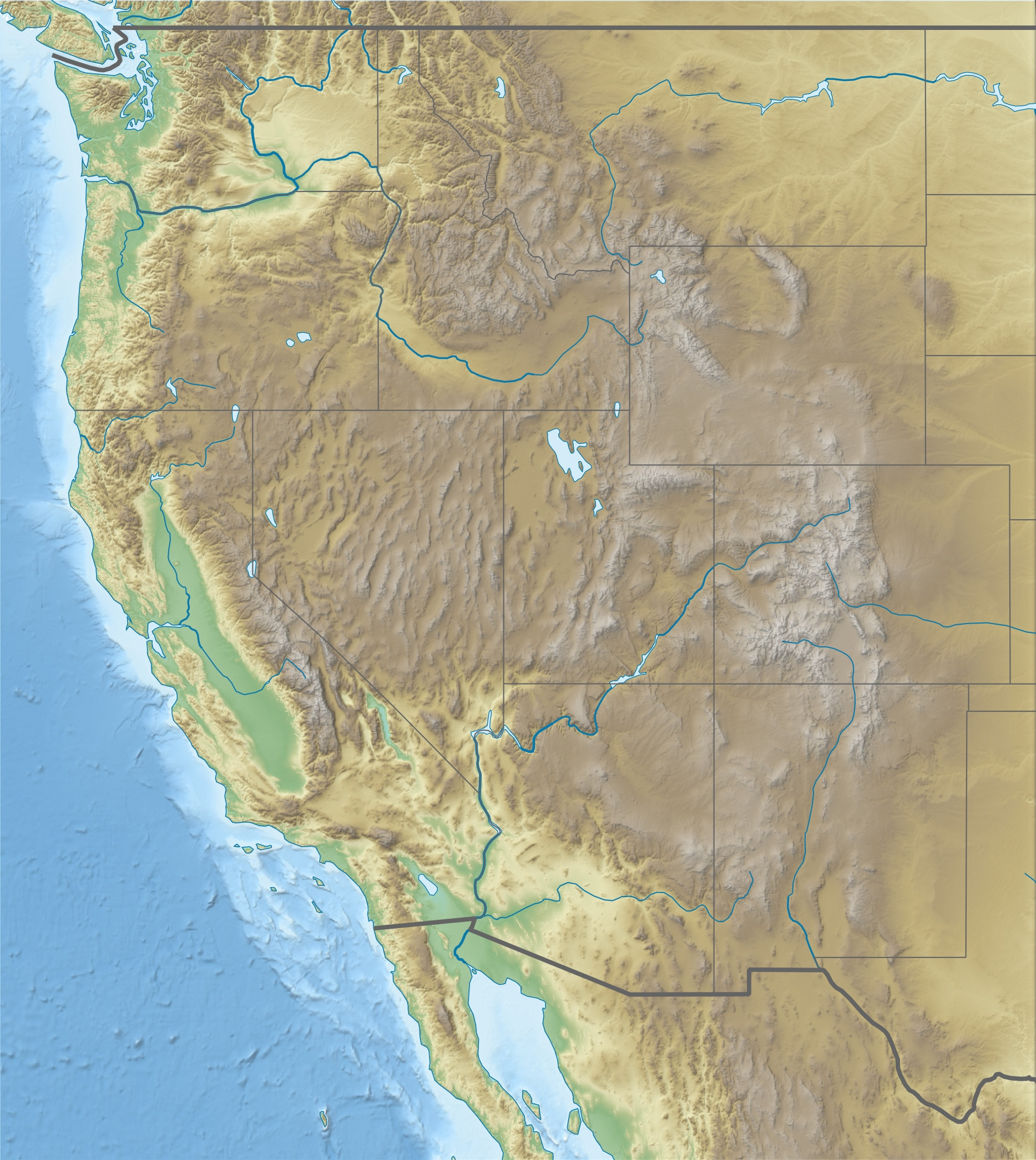
- Location within USA West
- Location: Colorado, USA
- Nearest city: Nunn, Colorado
- Coordinates: 40°30′N 104°26′W
- Area: 6,210 hectares (24.0 sq mi)
- Governing body: United States Department of Agriculture/Agricultural Research Service

The Central Plains Biosphere Reserve (established in 1976 and withdrawn in 2017) was a UNESCO Biosphere Reserve located in the western central Great Plains in north-central Colorado in the shortgrass prairie. The 6,210 hectares (24.0 sq mi) reserve encompasses the Central Plains Experimental Range (CPER) administered by the United States Department of Agriculture's Agricultural Research Service.

== History ==
The Central Plains Experimental Range has a long history of research on shortgrass prairie ecosystems and the effects of range management practices. Several areas in the reserve were farmed and grazed for many years and are now embedded in a countryside of intense agriculture.

In the Dust Bowl years of the mid 1930s, many farms and ranches of the western Great Plains were abandoned due to drought, overgrazing and soil blown from plowed fields. The U.S. Forest Service requested that the Central Plains Experimental Range be established to research improved management practices on fragile grasslands. The first research project was initiated in 1939 by the U.S. Forest Service. The Agricultural Act of 1953 reorganized the USDA and transferred administration of the CPER from the Forest Service to the Agricultural Research Service (ARS). Grazing studies begun in the 1930s are still being conducted to evaluate the long-term impacts of livestock on rangeland resources. Early studies at CPER focused on understanding plant life on native prairie and abandoned plowed lands, and on gaining knowledge of experimental techniques for measuring vegetation and livestock responses to different grazing systems. Numerous seeding trials for various range grasses were conducted; the resulting principles are used by consultants today. One of the most widely used scientific findings from past research at the CPER is livestock management decision-making based on ungrazed residue. Applicable information has been used to aid producers from Iceland to Africa. CPER is a part of the worldwide Long-Term Ecological Research (LTER) Program. Colorado State University and its Natural Resources Ecology Laboratory (NREL) have conducted extensive research at the site.

By request of the United States government, the Central Plains Biosphere Reserve was one of 17 reserves in the United States withdrawn from the UNESCO Man and the Biosphere Programme in June 2017.

== Monitoring ==
Monitoring is carried out on above-ground and below-ground plant biomass and livestock weights. There are four instrumented watersheds under different grazing intensities which are used to obtain data for water budgets.

== Vegetation composition ==
The predominant grasses that comprise over 70% of all aboveground biomass are blue grama and buffalograss, while other species that provide vertical structure to the shortgrass landscape include a combination of perennial cool season grasses (needle-and-thread grass, western wheatgrass, and squirreltail), warm season grasses (sand dropseed and purple threeawn), and the annual grass sixweeks fescue. Scarlet globemallow is the most common forb and while plains prickly pear cactus and shrubs/subshrubs (fourwing saltbush, broom snakeweed, rabbitbrush, spreading buckwheat, and fringed sagebrush) are present, they do not represent a large component of total biomass on the site.

== Sources ==
This article incorporates text from a free content work (license statement/permission). Text taken from UNESCO - MAB Biosphere Reserves Directory, UNESCO, UNESCO.
