= Lake Barco =

Lake in Putnam County, Florida

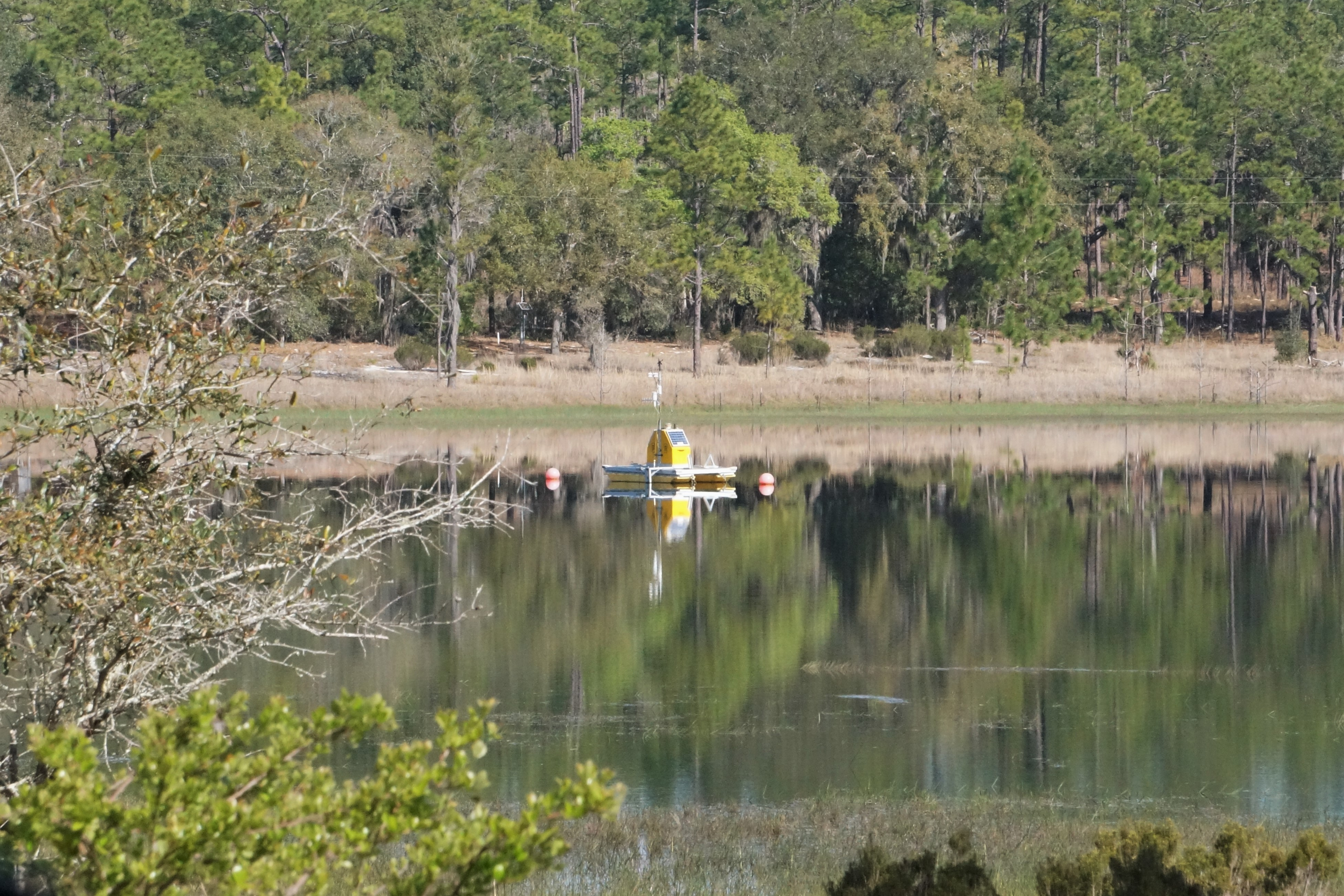
- Scientific buoy on Lake Barco

- Location within Florida
- Coordinates: 29°40′34″N 82°00′31″W
- Type: Lake
- Basin countries: United States

Lake Barco is a lake in Putnam County, Florida, United States. It is within the Ordway-Swisher Biological Station of the Institute of Food and Agricultural Sciences. It is roughly circular, about 200 metres (660 ft) in diameter. The nearest settlement is Melrose, Florida, about 5 kilometres (3.1 mi) to the northwest.

== Characteristics ==
Lake Barco is a sinkhole lake, typical of the region, where unconsolidated deposits on the surface have slumped into the highly soluble limestone of the upper Floridan aquifer. The organic-rich sediments of the lake bottom lie on an unconfined aquifer made up mostly of sands. Below this are the unconsolidated clays and sands of the Hawthorn Group, through which water can penetrate, and below this the Ocala Limestone of the upper Floridan aquifer.

Groundwater monitoring wells have been placed around Lake Barco and nearby Lake Suggs to study the hydrology of the area.

The lake has a mean annual temperature of 20 °C (68 °F) and median rainfall of 1,280 millimetres (50 in). It is recharged throughout the year. The lake is fed from the north and northeast by shallow groundwater, which seeps out towards the west and south. Deeper groundwater also flows below the lake.

From deuterium and oxygen-18 isotope dating it is evident that some water evaporates from the lake, while other water flows downward towards the Ocala limestone. The lake seems to have started to become more acidic around 1950 due to absorption of sulfate (SO_{4}) created by industrial processes from the atmosphere. The lake modifies the chemistry of the water that flows through it. As the water moves through the sediments in the lake bottom, which are rich in organics, the water is depleted in oxygen.

== Ecology ==
The lake is surrounded by evergreen forest and mixed shrub/grassland. Terrestrial amphibians, including the threatened gopher frog, use the lake as a breeding ground. It is an important watering hole for mammals and birds. The National Ecological Observatory Network samples the lake for aquatic organisms such as surface water microbes, macroinvertebrates, and zooplankton.
