= Itar =

Itar or ITAR may refer to:

- International Traffic in Arms Regulations, a set of U.S. Department of State regulations
- Information Telegraph Agency of Russia, or TASS, a Russian state-owned news agency
- Itar, a village near Nai Garhi, Rewa, Madhya Pradesh, India; site of an 1813 battle

== See also ==
- LTAR (disambiguation)
