= Luquillo Experimental Forest =

Protected area of tropical rainforest in northeastern Puerto Rico

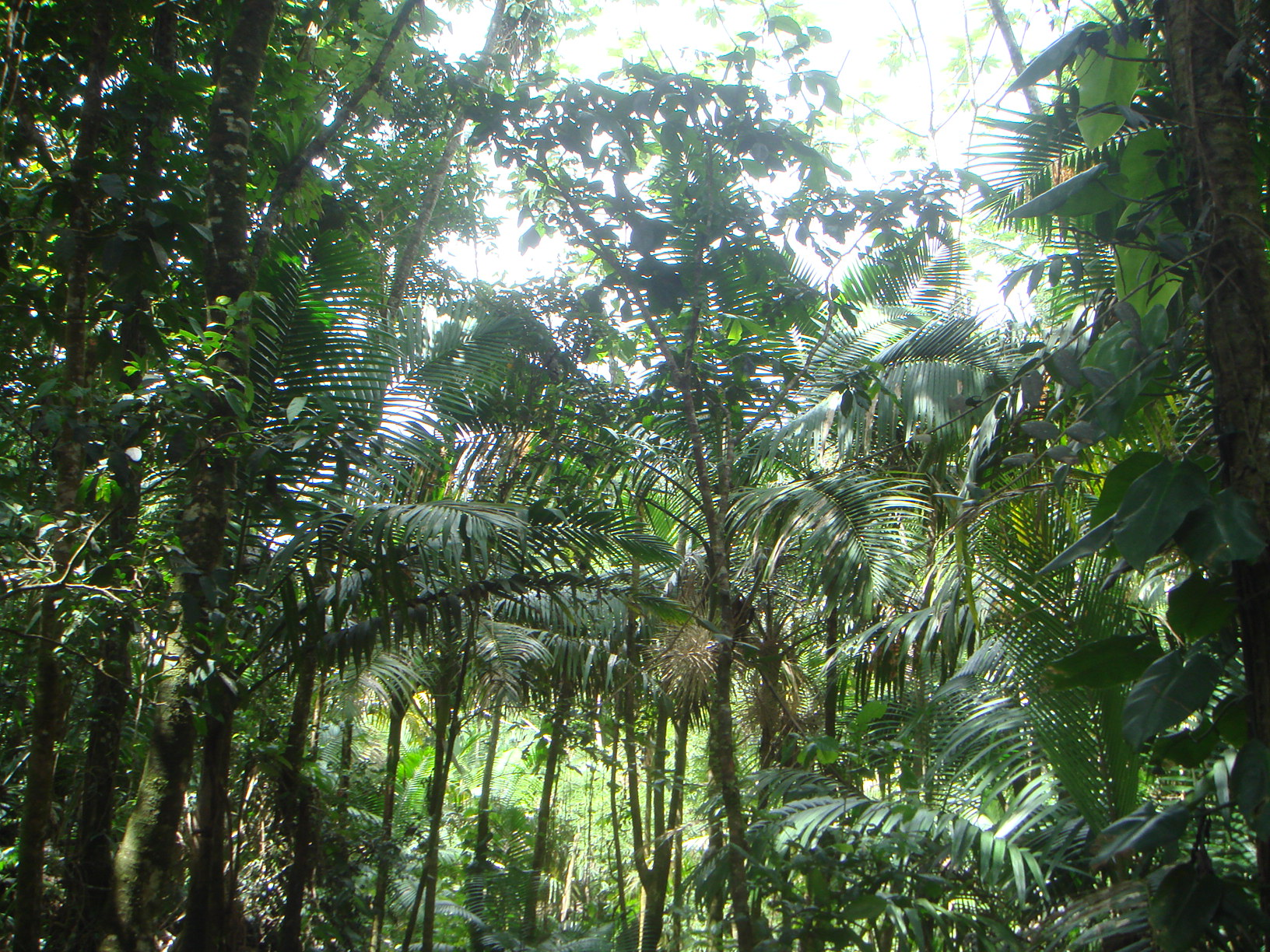
Prestoea montana in the El Yunque National Forest

The Luquillo Experimental Forest (LEF) (Bosque experimental de Luquillo) is a protected area of tropical rainforest in northeastern Puerto Rico. The experimental forest is located in the Sierra de Luquillo some 50 km (30 mi) east of San Juan, the capital of the island. It is a UNESCO Biosphere Reserve and is used for research into silviculture, forest regeneration, and other purposes.

== History ==
The Tropical Forest Research Station was founded in 1940 and became a center for ecosystem research. It was designated as a UNESCO Biosphere Reserve in 1976 with the objective of understanding "the long-term dynamics of tropical forest ecosystems characterized by large-scale, infrequent disturbance, rapid processing of organic material, and high habitat and species diversity".

Although the experimental forest is located within El Yunque National Forest, the two have different objectives. In a forest management plan drawn up in 1956, approximately 6,700 hectares (17,000 acres) were to be used for commercial timber production, mostly the lower, flatter part of the site. The remaining 4,630 hectares (11,400 acres), largely mountain peaks and steep slopes, were considered non-commercial and were set aside for research and other purposes. Much of the experimental area is used for silviculture and reforestation research, however certain areas have been left completely unmanaged, and are of global importance for use in long term ecological studies.

The experimental forest is one of 26 sites run by the Long Term Ecological Research Network, a group of international scientists studying ecological processes over long time scales. The facility was established in 1988 to study the "long-term effects of natural and human disturbances on tropical forests and streams in the Luquillo mountains". The aspects studied include how hurricanes and droughts have affected the environment, and the effects of changes in agricultural practices and increased urbanization. A central database is maintained, collaboration between scientists, students and volunteers is encouraged, and efforts are made to involve the local community.

== Sierra de Luquillo ==
The Sierra de Luquillo or Luquillo mountains are about 1,000 m (3,300 ft) high with steep, convoluted slopes. Trade winds off the Atlantic Ocean cool as they rise over the mountains, bringing an annual rainfall of 5,000 mm (200 in). The mountains are well-forested and are clad in mist for most of the year. The Luquillo Experimental Forest has an area of about 11,000 hectares (27,000 acres) and encompasses five different vegetation zones; montane wet forest, montane rainforest, wet forest, rainforest, and a small area of moist forest in the southwestern part. The experimental forest site is wholly inside the El Yunque National Forest, which covers a large part of the mountain range to the southwest of the city of Luquillo.

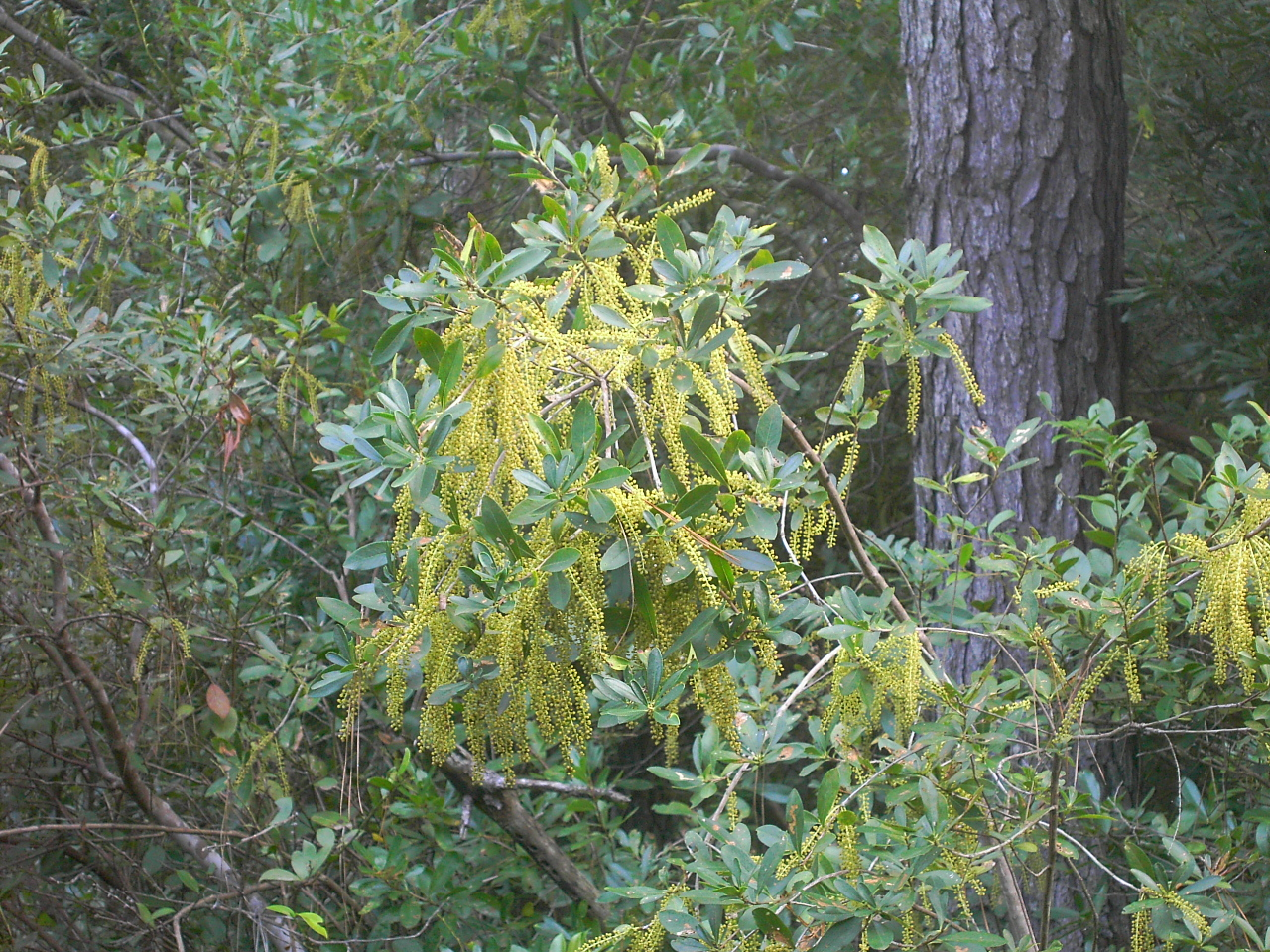
Palo colorado, Cyrilla racemiflora

The composition of the forest varies according to the elevation, soil types and other factors. Compared to most mainland tropical forests the site has a low floral biodiversity; for example, only eight species of tree account for 75% of tree density. The lower parts are dominated by the Tabonuco tree (Dacryodes excelsa), the lower middle slopes by the Palo colorado (Cyrilla racemiflora), and the upper middle is predominantly Palma de sierra (Prestoea montana). The upper slopes, with their perpetual cloud cover and permanently saturated soils, are clad with trees of low stature and are known as dwarf forest. The dominant tree species here in the upper elevations include: Tabebuia rigida, Eugenia borinquensis, and Calycogonium squamulosum.

== Research ==
Over 2,500 research studies having been performed in the Luquillo Experimental Forest. One area of research is the resilience of the ecosystem in the face of hurricanes, landslides, and such long term changes as alterations in agricultural practices and use. A study in 2018 compared the biomass of animals collected in the forest with data from the 1970s and found a large decline, which the authors attributed to global warming, although the conclusions were disputed by a larger group of researchers working in the area, who were unable to replicate most of the findings, including the temperature change.
