= Disney Wilderness Preserve =

Wilderness preserve in Florida

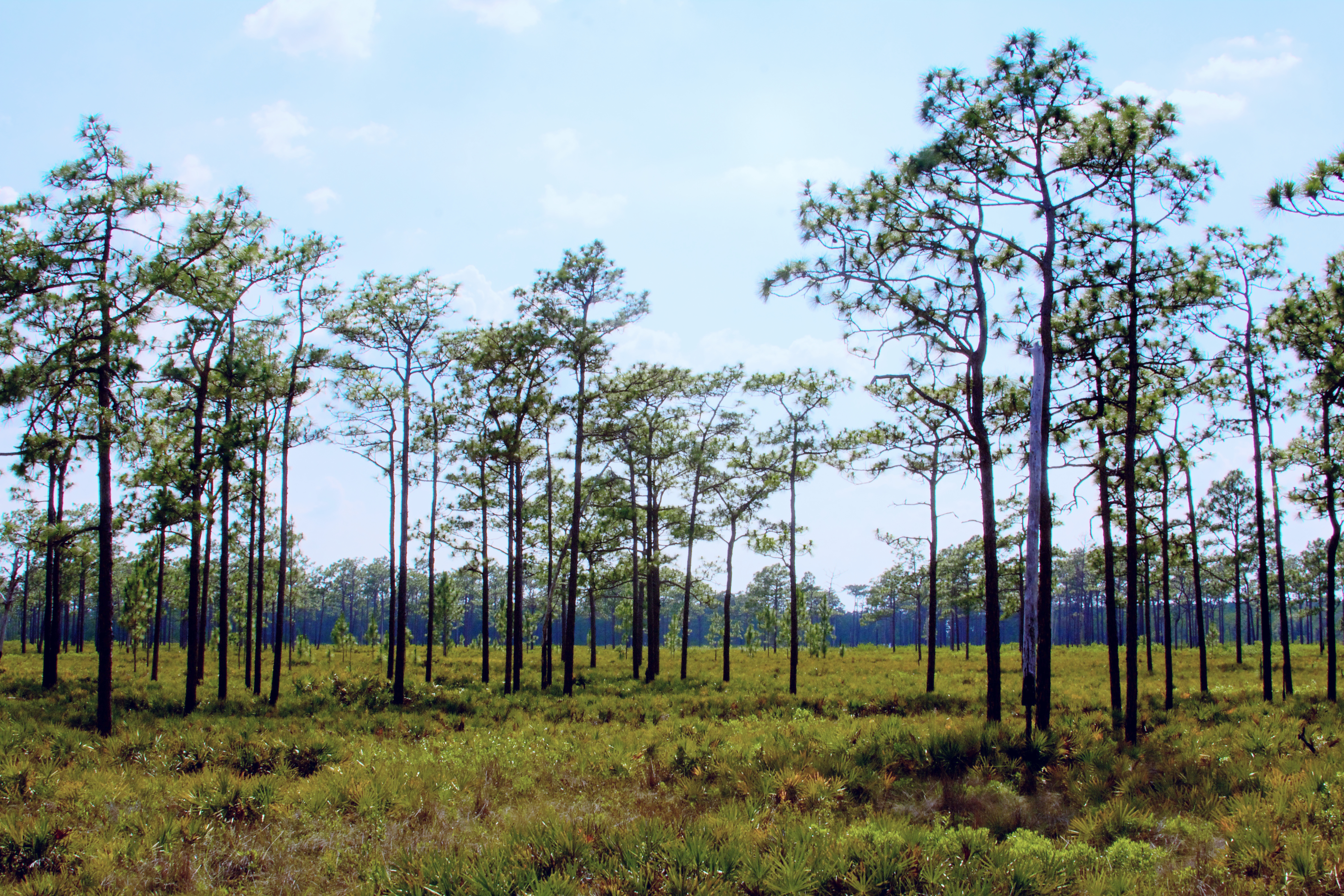
- Longleaf pine stand at the Disney Wilderness Preserve

- Location within Florida
- Nearest city: Kissimmee, Florida
- Coordinates: 28.1290°N 81.4302°W
- Area: 11,500 acres (47 km^{2})
- Established: 1993
- Owner: The Nature Conservancy

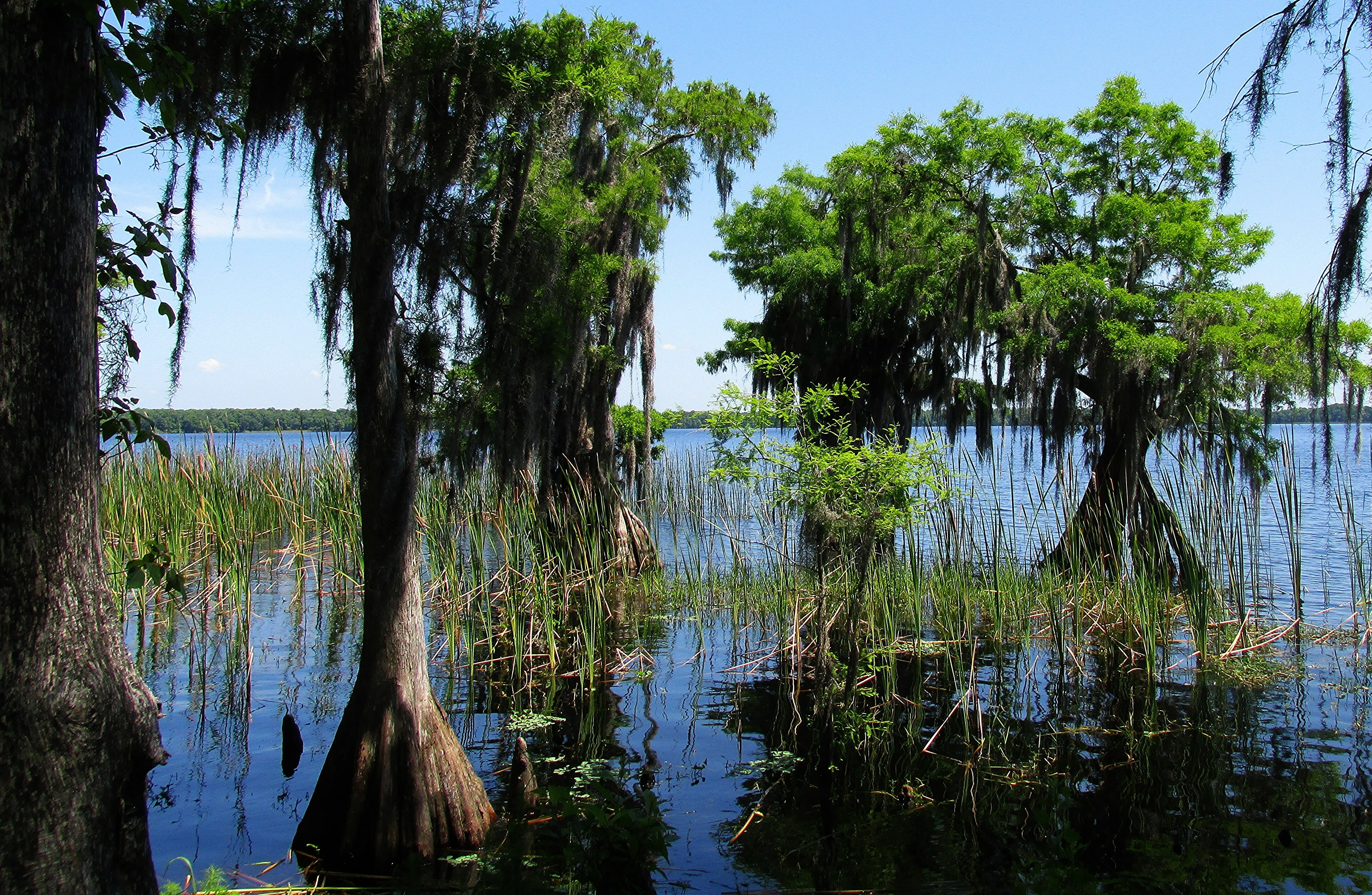
Lake Russell, one of the only undeveloped lakefronts in central Florida.

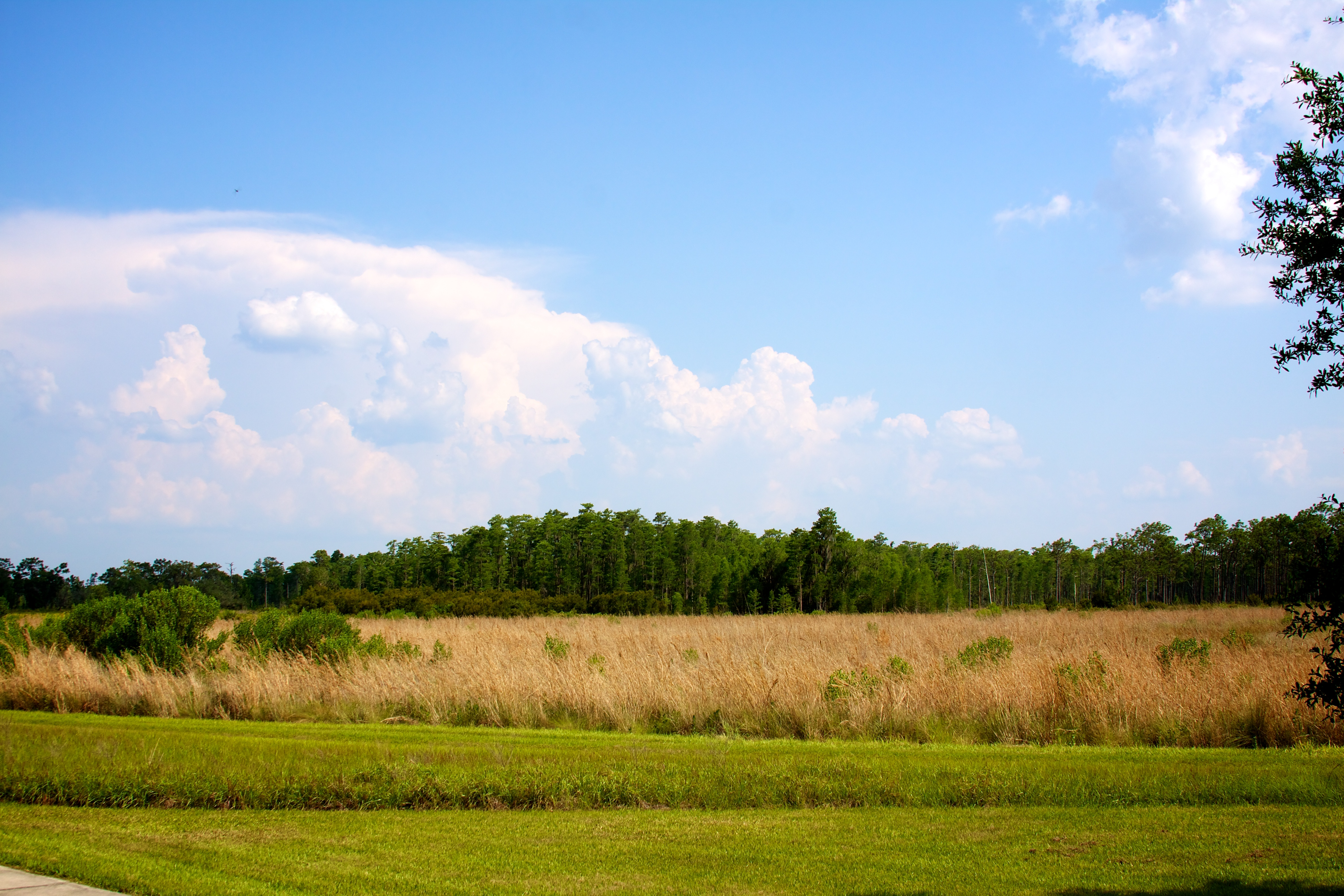
Habitat restoration at the Disney Wilderness Preserve

The Disney Wilderness Preserve is a 11,500-acre nature reserve near Kissimmee, Florida. It was created through an agreement between The Walt Disney Company, The Nature Conservancy, and the state of Florida. It is located fifteen miles south of Walt Disney World.

== History ==
Walt Disney World was seeking permits for the expansion of Celebration in the early 1990s. There was considerable environmentalist push-back, as further development would lead to the destruction of wetlands. In a form of mitigation banking, Disney secured the purchase of the 8,500 acre Walker Ranch in 1991. The ranch, located adjacent to Walt Disney World, was active in the 1940s and had been extensively logged and grazed. The goal was to restore portions of the pastureland into a native wetland ecosystem to compensate for future expansion at Walt Disney World.

The Disney Wilderness Preserve was formed from the Walker Ranch parcel and was officially established in April 1993. It was thereafter owned and managed by The Nature Conservancy. The Walt Disney Company provided additional funds for landscape rehabilitation and wildlife monitoring. As of 2003, Disney committed almost $40 million to the project.

The Greater Orlando Aviation Authority added 3,000 acres to the preserve in 1995 to offset the expansion of Orlando International Airport.

In 2014, Walt Disney World purchased a 3,000 acre failed resort development called Mira Lago. The parcel is adjacent to the Disney Wilderness Preserve, located in Poinciana. Although it was speculated that the land would be integrated in the preserve, Disney retained private ownership of the parcel. The land is similarly managed for wetland conservation.

== Characteristics ==
The Disney Wilderness Preserve is located on the headwaters of the Greater Everglades watershed. It is bordered by Lake Russell to the north, Lake Hatchineha to the south, Reedy Creek to the east, and privately owned land to the west. It is seasonally wet and flooded, receiving an average of 1150 mm of precipitation annually.

The principal goal of the Disney Wilderness Preserve is to restore and manage wetland ecosystems. As of 2013, 3,222 acres of wetlands and 300 acres of uplands had been restored within the boundaries of the preserve. Wet conditions were reintroduced to the former pastureland through the removal of invasive grasses, such as bahiagrass, using herbicide treatments and prescribed burns. Agricultural ditches also had to be removed. The site is still routinely maintained through controlled burning.

The site is dominated by flatwoods, Florida scrub, and cypress dome ecosystems. Over 1,000 species of plant and animals inhabit the preserve. This includes 70 species of butterfly, 80 species of reptiles and amphibians, and 151 species of bird. The National Audubon Society considers the Disney Wilderness Preserve an Important Bird Area. Florida black bears and Florida panthers have been sighted in the preserve.

== Recreation ==
On November 11, 1999, the Disney Wilderness Preserve opened to the public. The park offers an educational center and 7 miles of trails.

== Scientific initiatives ==
The Nature Conservancy is working with the U.S. Fish and Wildlife Service on an initiative to reintroduce the red-cockaded woodpecker to the longleaf pine habitat found in the Disney Wilderness Preserve. The University of Central Florida and the National Ecological Observatory Network conduct ecological research within the Disney Wilderness Preserve.
