= Park Grass Experiment =

Long-term, large-scale grass growth investigation in Hertfordshire, England

The Park Grass Experiment is a biological study originally set up to test the effect of fertilizers and manures on hay yields. The scientific experiment is located at Rothamsted Research in the English county of Hertfordshire, and is notable as one of the longest-running experiments of modern science, as it was initiated in 1856 and has been continually monitored ever since.

The experiment was originally designed to answer agricultural questions but has since proved an invaluable resource for studying natural selection and biodiversity. The treatments under study were found to be affecting the botanical make-up of the plots and the ecology of the 28,000-square-metre (6.9-acre) field and it has been studied ever since. In spring, the field is a colourful tapestry of flowers and grasses, some plots still having the wide range of plants that most meadows probably contained hundreds of years ago.

Over its history, Park Grass has:

- demonstrated that conventional field trials probably underestimate threats to plant biodiversity from long term changes, such as soil acidification,
- shown how plant species richness, biomass and pH are related,
- demonstrated that competition between plants can make the effects of climatic variation on communities more extreme,
- provided one of the first demonstrations of local evolutionary change under different selection pressures and
- endowed us with an archive of soil and hay samples that have been used to track the history of atmospheric pollution, including nuclear fallout.

== Bibliography ==
- Rothamsted Research: Classical Experiments
- Silvertown, J.; Poulton, P.; Johnston, E.; Edwards, G.; Heard, M.; Biss, P.M. (2006), "The Park Grass Experiment 1856-2006: its contribution to ecology", Journal of Ecology, 94 (4): 801–814, Bibcode:2006JEcol..94..801S, doi:10.1111/j.1365-2745.2006.01145.x
