= Lake Suggs =

Lake in Putnam County, Florida

- Suggs Lake
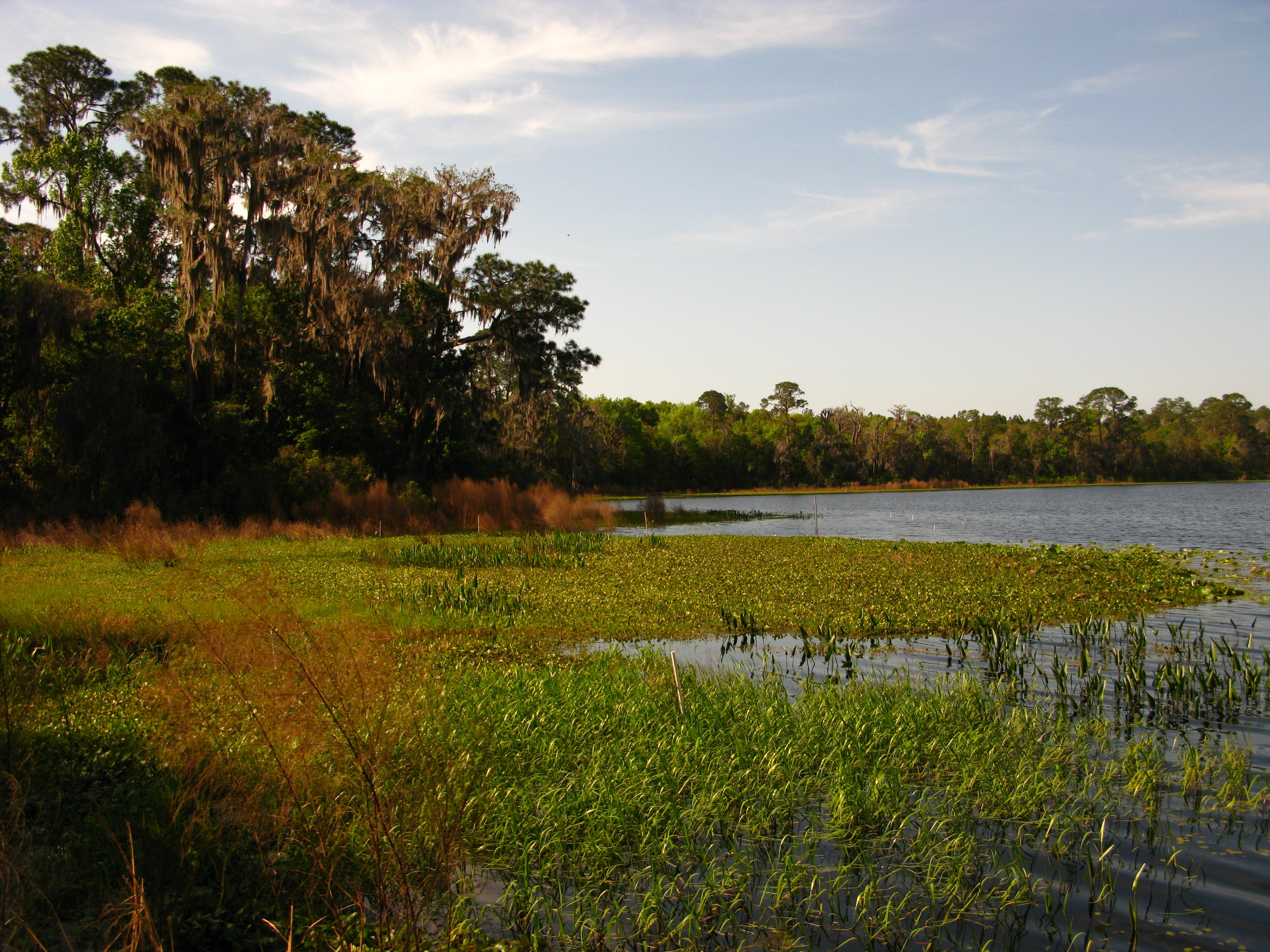
- Lake Suggs, 2008

- Location within Florida
- Coordinates: 29°41′13″N 82°00′58″W
- Type: Lake
- Basin countries: United States
- Surface area: 0.73 km^{2} (0.28 sq mi)
- Max. depth: 5.7 m (19 ft)
- Surface elevation: 29 m (95 ft)

Lake Suggs, alternatively called Suggs Lake, is a lake in Putnam County, Florida. It is within the Ordway-Swisher Biological Station of the Institute of Food and Agricultural Sciences. It is a marshy seepage lake and considered a baygall.

The chemical concentrations of the lake have been studied since the 1970s. Groundwater monitoring wells have been placed around Lake Suggs and nearby Lake Barco to study the hydrology of the area.

== Characteristics ==
Lake Suggs is a small mesotrophic lake only 0.73 km^{2} in size. There is little to no surface inflow or outflow, however, there is significant subsurface interaction with the groundwater aquifer. The lake is relatively shallow, with a mean depth of 2.5 m.

The lake has a high dissolved organic carbon content, and is acidic as a result. It has a pH of 4.74.

== Ecology ==
The lake is surrounded by cypress swamps and hardwood forests. It is densely populated with amphibians, including salamanders of the genera Siren, Amphiuma, and Pseudobranchus.
