= Long-Term Agroecosystem Research Network =

U.S. agricultural sustainability organization

LTAR Network logo

The Long-Term Agroecosystem Research (LTAR) Network is a project to understand and enhance the sustainability of agriculture through coordinated research and long-term study. The network contains 18 sites located throughout the continental United States. Each site was selected based on research productivity, capacity for infrastructure, potential data richness and availability, geographic coverage at various scales, agency partnerships, and long-term institutional commitment.

The project is managed by the USDA-ARS in partnership with local institutions. LTAR is the only US based long-term observatory network focused on studying agroecosystems.

== See also ==
- Long Term Ecological Research Network
- National Ecological Observatory Network
