= Long Term Ecological Research Network =

Network of researchers studying ecological processes

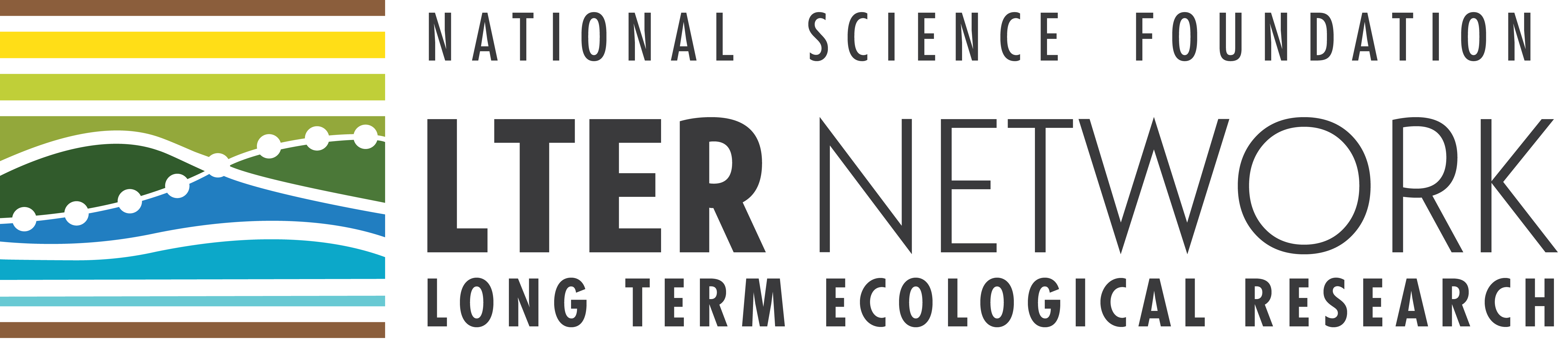
- Abbreviation: LTER
- Purpose: Ecological research
- Headquarters: Santa Barbara, California
- Region served: United States
- Website: www.lternet.edu

The Long Term Ecological Research (LTER) Network operated by the United States National Science Foundation (NSF) consists of a group of over 1800 scientists and students studying ecological processes over extended temporal and spatial scales. The Network represents the collection of individual research sites and the community of scientists that make up the US NSF LTER initiative. The Network is the operational entity where researchers at each site conduct long-term ecological research, share data, and collaborate on cross-site and synthesis projects. The Network is coordinated by a central office.

As of August 2025, a total of 27 LTER sites from the McMurdo Dry Valleys in Antarctica to the California Central Coast cover a diverse set of ecosystems. It is part of the International Long Term Ecological Research Network (ILTER). The US NSF LTER Program was established in 1980 to support long-term ecological research at selected sites across the US, chosen to represent major ecosystem types, and is funded by the US National Science Foundation. Data from LTER sites is publicly available in the Environmental Data Initiative repository and findable through DataONE search.

== LTER sites ==
Former LTER Network logo (until 2017)

There are 27 sites within the LTER Network across the United States, Puerto Rico, and Antarctica, each conducting research on different ecosystems. LTER sites are both physical places and communities of researchers. Some of the physical places are remote or protected from development, others are deliberately located in cities or agricultural areas. Either way, the program of research for each LTER is tailored to the most pressing and promising questions for that location and the program of research determines the group of researchers with the skills and interests to pursue those questions.

While each LTER site has a unique situation—with different organizational partners and different scientific challenges—the members of the Network apply several common approaches to understanding long-term ecological phenomena. These include observation, large-scale experiments, modeling, synthesis science and partnerships.

- Andrews Forest LTER (AND)
- Arctic LTER (ARC)
- Baltimore Ecosystem Study LTER (BES)
- Beaufort Lagoon Ecosystem LTER (BLE)
- Bonanza Creek LTER (BNZ)
- Central Arizona - Phoenix LTER (CAP)
- California Current Ecosystem LTER (CCE)
- Cedar Creek LTER (CDR)
- Coweeta LTER (CWT) - NSF LTER funding from 1980-2020
- Florida Coastal Everglades LTER (FCE)
- Georgia Coastal Ecosystems LTER (GCE)
- Harvard Forest LTER (HFR)
- Hubbard Brook LTER (HBR)
- Jornada Basin LTER (JRN)
- Kellogg Biological Station LTER (KBS)
- Konza Prairie LTER (KNZ)
- Luquillo LTER (LUQ)
- McMurdo Dry Valleys LTER (MCM)
- Minneapolis-St. Paul LTER (MSP)
- Moorea Coral Reef LTER (MCR)
- Niwot Ridge LTER (NWT)
- North Temperate Lakes LTER (NTL)
- Northeast U.S. Shelf LTER (NES)
- Northern Gulf of Alaska LTER (NGA)
- Palmer LTER (PAL)
- Plum Island Ecosystem LTER (PIE)
- Santa Barbara Coastal LTER (SBC)
- Sevilleta LTER (SEV)
- Shortgrass Steppe LTER (SGS) - funded from 1982-2014 at the Central Plains Experimental Range
- Virginia Coast Reserve LTER (VCR)

== See also ==
- National Ecological Observatory Network
- Long-Term Agroecosystem Research Network
