= Skomer =

Island in Pembrokeshire, Marloes and St Brides, Wales

Ynys Sgomer (Welsh)
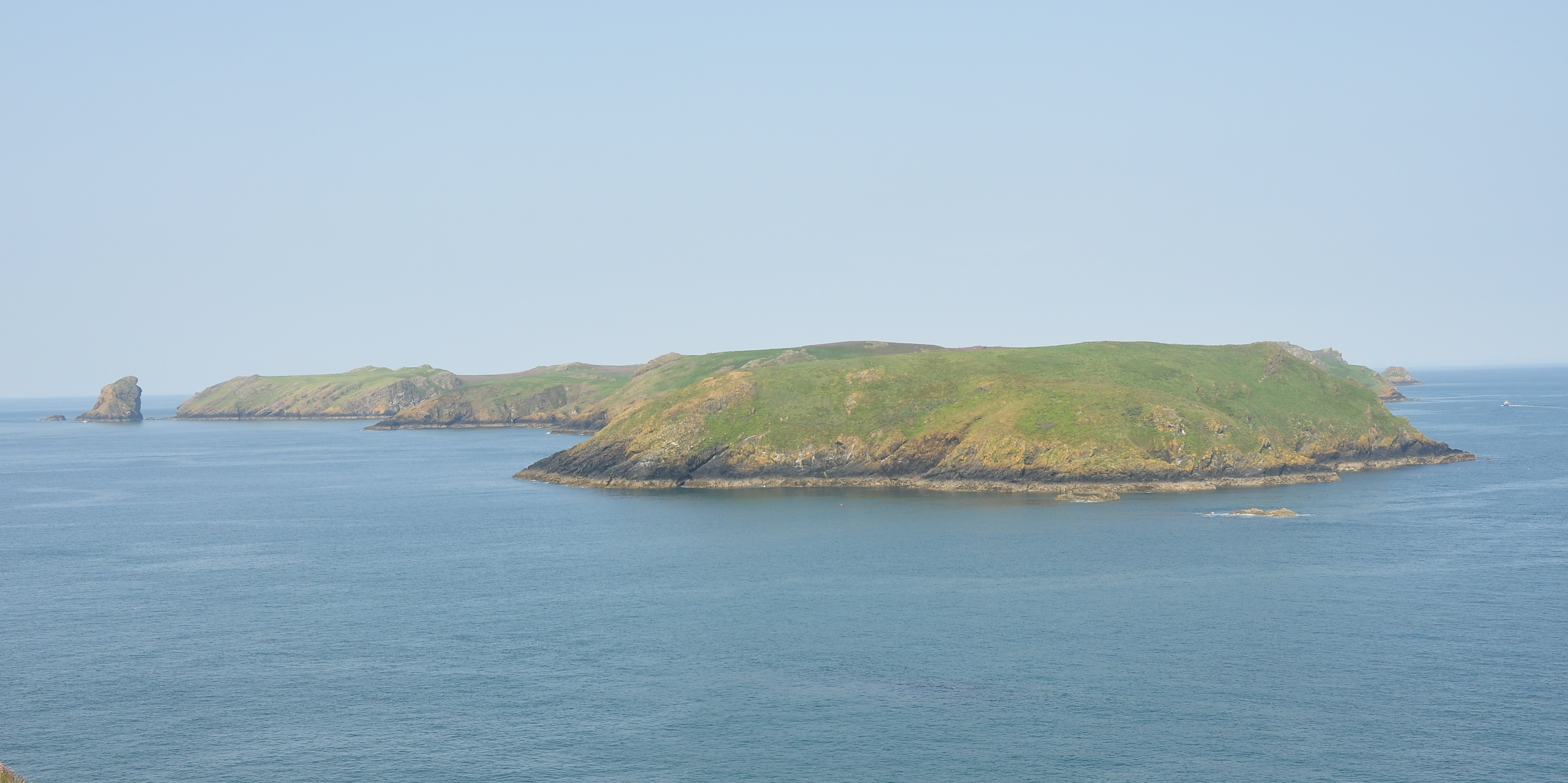
- Skomer viewed from Martin's Haven

- Location within Wales

Geography
- Location: Jack Sound
- Coordinates: 51.7375°N 5.2950°W
- Area: 2.92 km^{2} (1.13 sq mi)
- Length: 3.2 km (1.99 mi)
- Width: 2.4 km (1.49 mi)

Administration
- Wales
- County: Pembrokeshire
- Community: Marloes and St Brides

Additional information
- grid reference SM725093

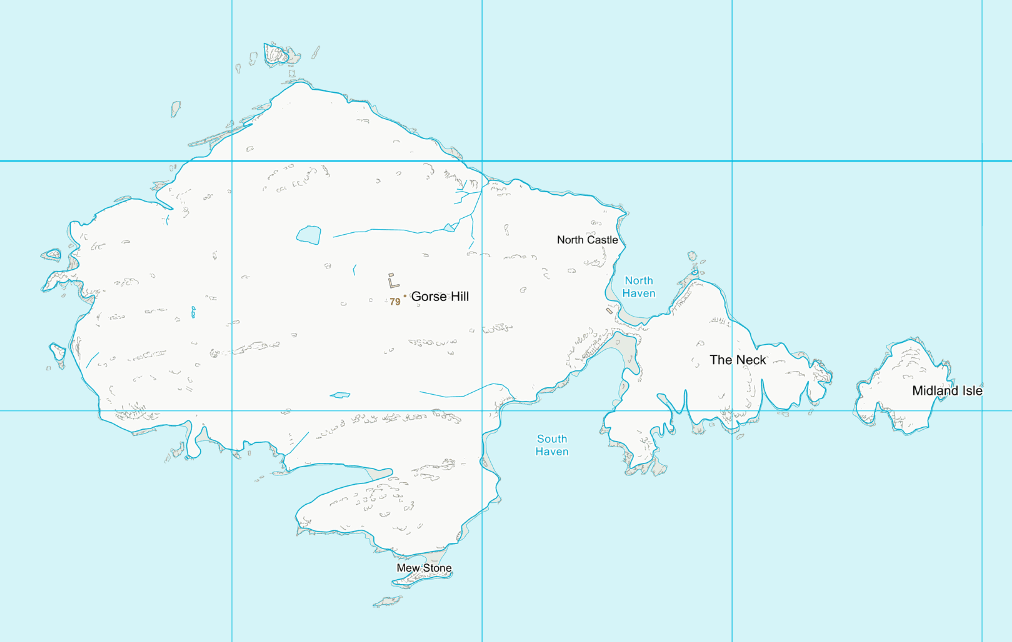
Map of Skomer

Skomer (Welsh: Ynys Sgomer) or Skomer Island is an island off the coast of Pembrokeshire, in the community of Marloes and St Brides in west Wales. It is well known for its wildlife: around half the world's population of Manx shearwaters nest on the island, the Atlantic puffin colony is the largest in southern Britain, and the Skomer vole (a subspecies of the bank vole) is unique to the island. Skomer is a national nature reserve, a Site of Special Scientific Interest and a Special Protection Area. It is surrounded by a marine nature reserve and is managed by the Wildlife Trust of South and West Wales.

Skomer is known for its archaeological interest: stone circles, standing stone and remains of prehistoric houses. Much of the island has been designated an ancient monument.

A video of the Skomer Marine Conservation Zone, by Natural Resources Wales

Seal playing with NRW diver near Skomer

== Description ==
The island has an area of 2.92 square kilometres (720 acres). Its highest point is 79 metres (259 ft) above sea level at Gorse Hill, while the majority of the island sits at around 60 metres (200 ft) above sea level. Skomer is intersected by a series of slopes and ridges giving it a rich and varied topography. It is approximately 2.4 kilometres (1.5 mi) from north–south and 3.2 kilometres (2.0 mi) east–west.

The island is almost cut in two near its eastern side by two bays. It is one of several islands lying within 1 kilometre (0.62 mi) of the Pembrokeshire coast. A number of islets surround Skomer, the largest of which are Midland Isle (50 metres [160 ft] high) separated from Skomer by Little Sound, Mew Stone (60 metres [200 ft] high), and Garland Stone (32 metres [105 ft] high).

== Name ==
The name Skomer derives from Skalmey, a name of Viking origin meaning "Cleft island", possibly from the fact that the eastern end of the island is nearly cut off from the main part. It is marked on a 1578 map in Latin as Scaline Insul, with the first word probably meaning scalene or unequal.

== Geology ==
The volcanic rocks of which Skomer is comprised date from the Silurian period around 440 million years ago. A series of basalts, rhyolites, felsites, keratophyres, mugearite and associated sedimentary rocks (quartzites, etc.) are grouped together as the 'Skomer Volcanic Series'. The series which is up to 1,000 metres (3,300 ft) thick also includes trachyte, dolerite and skomerite which is an altered andesite. Basalt is the most common component of this sequence; some of it appears as pillow lava indicating that it was erupted under water. Other basalt flows show signs of contemporary subaerial weathering.

This same suite of rocks can also be traced eastwards on the mainland along the northern side of the Marloes peninsula and extends almost as far east as St Ishmael's. The entire sequence on Skomer dips between 15° and 25° to the south-southeast. It is cut by several faults, notably those responsible for the erosion of the inlets of North Haven and South Haven. A NW-SE aligned fault stretches between Bull Hole and South Haven, offsetting the strata on either side.

Skomer was cut off from the mainland by rising sea levels after the last Ice Age.

== History ==
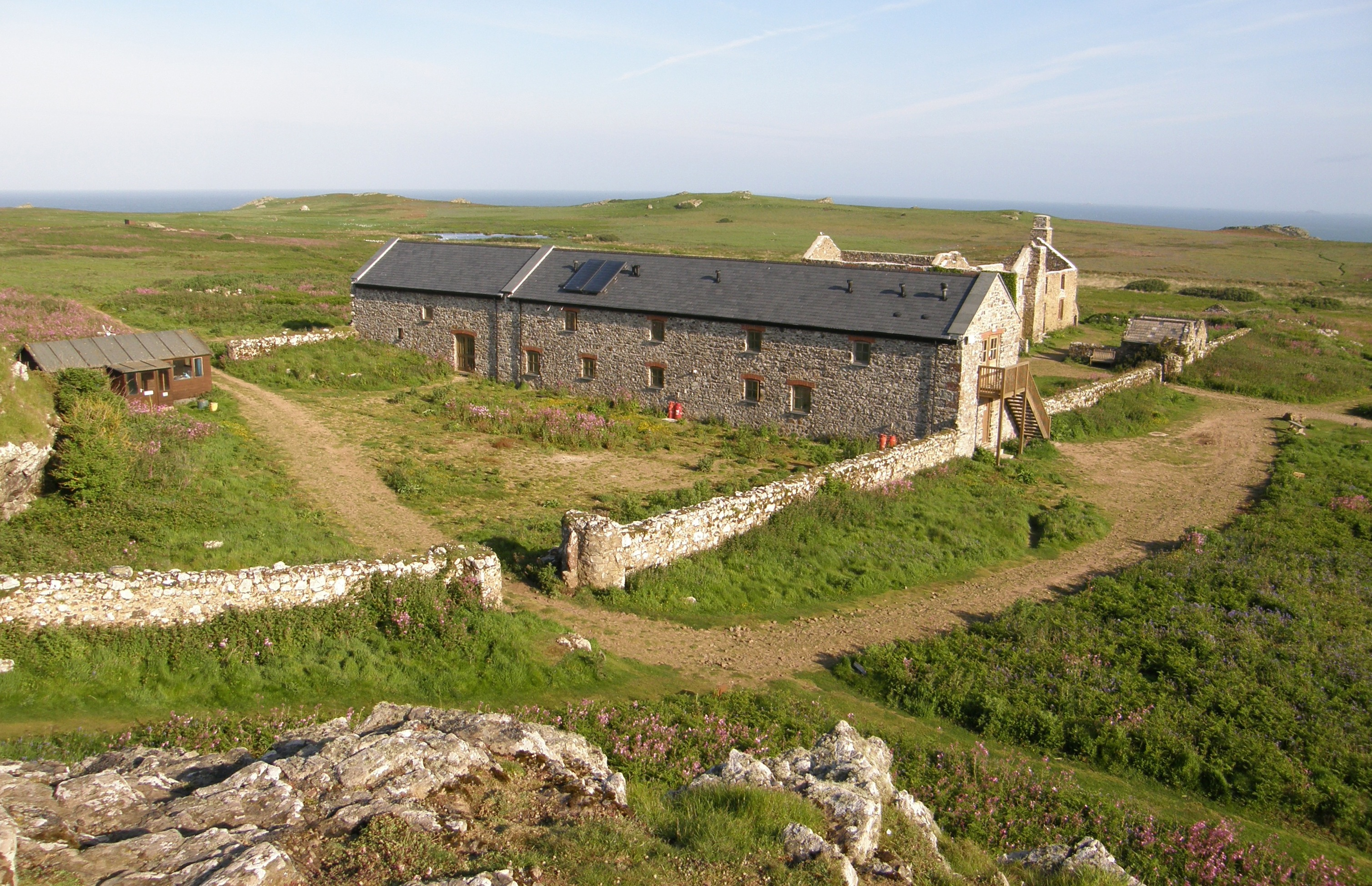
The Old Farm

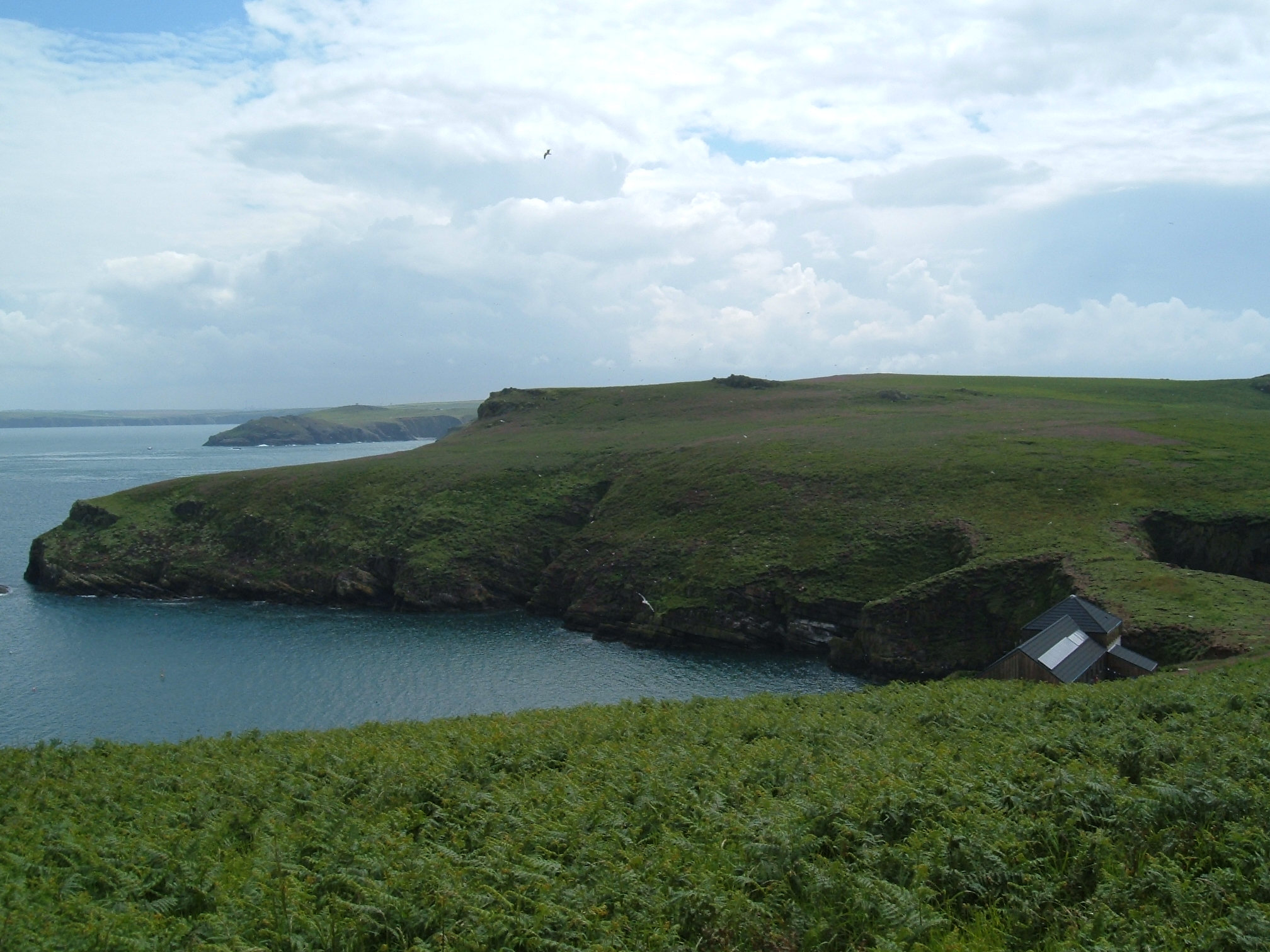
North Haven showing the Warden's House

There is evidence of human occupation—field boundaries and settlement remains—dating back to the Iron Age.

The Skomer Island Project, run jointly by the Royal Commission for Ancient and Historical Monuments in Wales (RCAHMW) with archaeologists from the University of Sheffield and Cardiff University, started in 2011, investigates the island's prehistoric communities. Airborne laser scanning together with ground excavations continued in 2016 and established that human settlement dates back 5,000 years. Rabbits were introduced in the 14th century and their burrows and grazing have had a profound effect on the island landscape.

It was last permanently inhabited by the Codd family (all year round) in 1950. After the Second World War, the owner had offered the West Wales Field Society, now The Wildlife Trust of South and West Wales, the opportunity to make a survey of Skomer which was accepted and Skomer opened for visitors from April 1946. The farm buildings in the centre of the island, now housing visitor accommodation, were refurbished in 2005. Skomer was featured in the BBC TV documentary Coast in Episode 4 of Series 5 (first aired August 2010).

David Saunders MBE was in 1960 the first warden of Skomer. In 1963, the Look at Life documentary series featured Skomer and its nature, and Saunders' role as warden and his home life with his wife and family.

== Wildlife ==
Skomer is best known for its large breeding seabird population, including Manx shearwaters, guillemots, razorbills, great cormorants, black-legged kittiwakes, Atlantic puffins, European storm-petrels, common shags, Eurasian oystercatchers and gulls, as well as birds of prey including short-eared owls, common kestrels and peregrine falcons. The island is also home to grey seals, common toads, slow-worms, a breeding population of glow-worms and a variety of wildflowers. Harbour porpoises and Common dolphins regularly occur in the surrounding waters. The Skomer vole, a subspecies of bank vole, is endemic to the island.

=== Atlantic puffin ===
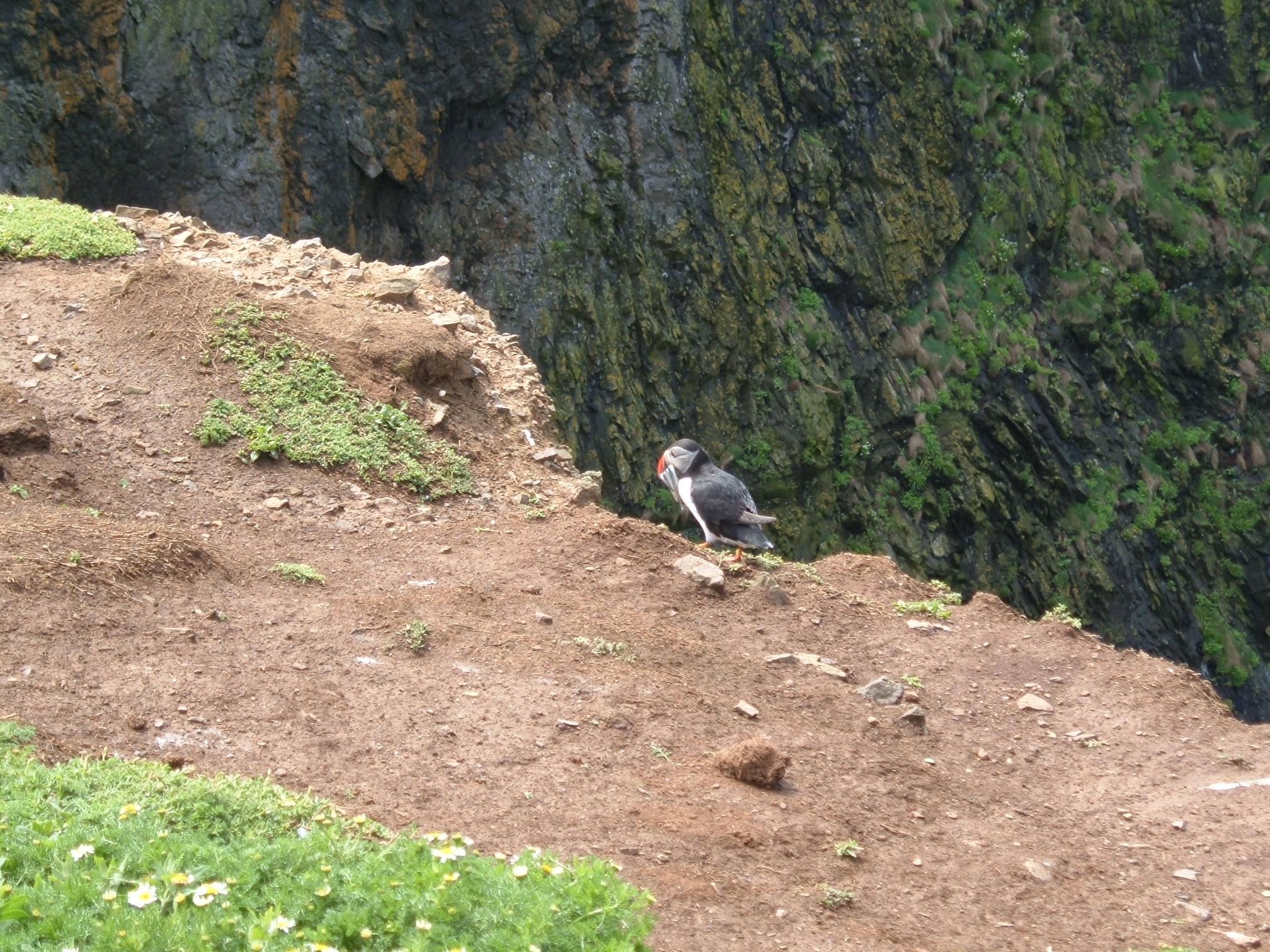
Puffin at the Wick with food

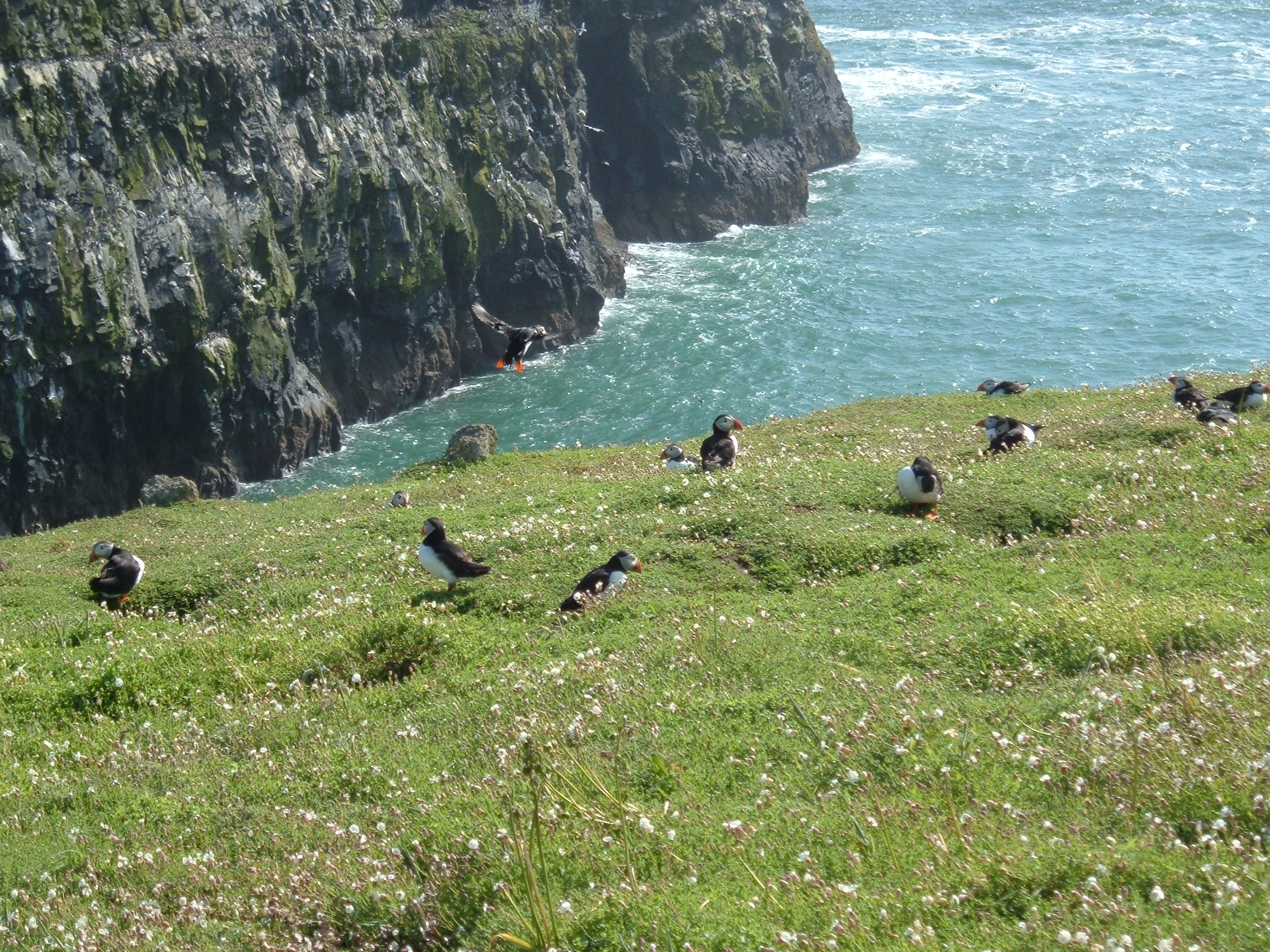
Puffin landing at the Wick

There are around 43,000 puffins on Skomer Island, making it one of the most important puffin colonies in Britain. They arrive in mid-April to nest in burrows, many of which were originally dug by the island's large rabbit population. The last puffins leave the island by the second or third week in July. They feed mainly on small fish and sand eels; often puffins can be seen with up to a dozen small eels in their beaks.

After a period of declining numbers between the 1950s and 1970s, the size of the colony is growing again at 1–2% a year (as of 2006). By 2004, there were numerous puffin burrows on the island and adults flying back with food run across the walkways oblivious to the tourists. A 2019 survey estimated a population of 24,108 birds, and in 2020 this had increased to 34,796 birds. The figure in 2025 was 43,626 birds.

=== Manx shearwater ===
In 2011, an estimated 310,000 pairs of Manx shearwater were breeding on Skomer, with around 40,000 pairs on the "sister" island Skokholm. A 2019 survey estimated the Skomer population at almost 350,000, a 10 per cent increase. The colony comprises around half the world population and make the islands the world's most important breeding site for the species. The birds nest in burrows, which they either excavate themselves or commandeer from other burrow-making species, such as rabbits. Pairs will typically use the same burrow year after year.

Shearwaters are not easy to see as they come and go at night, but a closed-circuit television camera in one of the burrows allows subterranean nesting activity to be seen on the screen in Lockley Lodge on the mainland at Martin's Haven. The remains of shearwaters killed by the island's population of great black-backed gulls can also be seen.

The young Manx shearwaters remain at sea for five years before returning to breed on their natal island. On their return they navigate back to within a few metres (yards) of the burrow in which they were born. As they are ungainly and vulnerable on the land, they leave their burrows only at night to avoid predation by gulls also breeding on the island. They head for the fishing grounds some 30 miles (fifty kilometres) north out in the Irish Sea. Manx shearwater chicks fledge in late August and September and immediately migrate south to the coastlines of South America to overwinter, before returning to UK waters the next spring.

=== Skomer vole ===
Skomer has one unique mammal: the Skomer vole (Myodes glareolus skomerensis), a distinct subspecies of the bank vole. The lack of land-based predators on the island means that the bracken habitat is an ideal place for the vole, with the population reaching around 20,000 during the summer months. Then the resident short-eared owls may be seen patrolling the areas close to the farmhouse in the centre of the island for voles to feed their young.

== Lichens ==
Skomer Island supports a diverse and ecologically significant lichen flora, with 248 recorded species (as of 1995), including numerous saxicolous (rock-dwelling) species that grow in the island's exposed maritime environment. The lichen communities on the island shows well-defined zonation patterns, influenced by rock type, exposure to salt spray, and nutrient enrichment from the island's abundant seabird populations. The lower littoral zone is dominated by Hydropunctaria maura and associated species, forming a black crust on wave-exposed rocks. Above this, a striking yellow-orange band is created by Teloschistaceae-family lichens, such as Caloplaca marina and Verrucoplaca verruculifera, while the xeric-supralittoral zone supports communities dominated by Ramalina siliquosa and other maritime lichens. In areas with high levels of seabird activity, nitrogen- and phosphorus-rich guano influences the composition of lichen communities, promoting the growth of species such as Xanthoria parietina and Candelariella coralliza on bird-perching rocks.

Several rare and biogeographically significant lichens occur on Skomer, including Roccella fuciformis, a Mediterranean-Atlantic species at its northern limit, and Teloschistes flavicans, a species of conservation concern in Britain. The island's geological diversity, with acid rhyolites, basaltic lavas, and quartz conglomerates, further contributes to the variety of lichen habitats. Monitoring programs have been established to track long-term changes in lichen populations, particularly in response to fluctuations in seabird numbers and environmental disturbances such as oil pollution. The 1996 Sea Empress oil spill raised concerns about potential impacts on Skomer's maritime lichens, highlighting the need for ongoing conservation efforts.

== Access ==
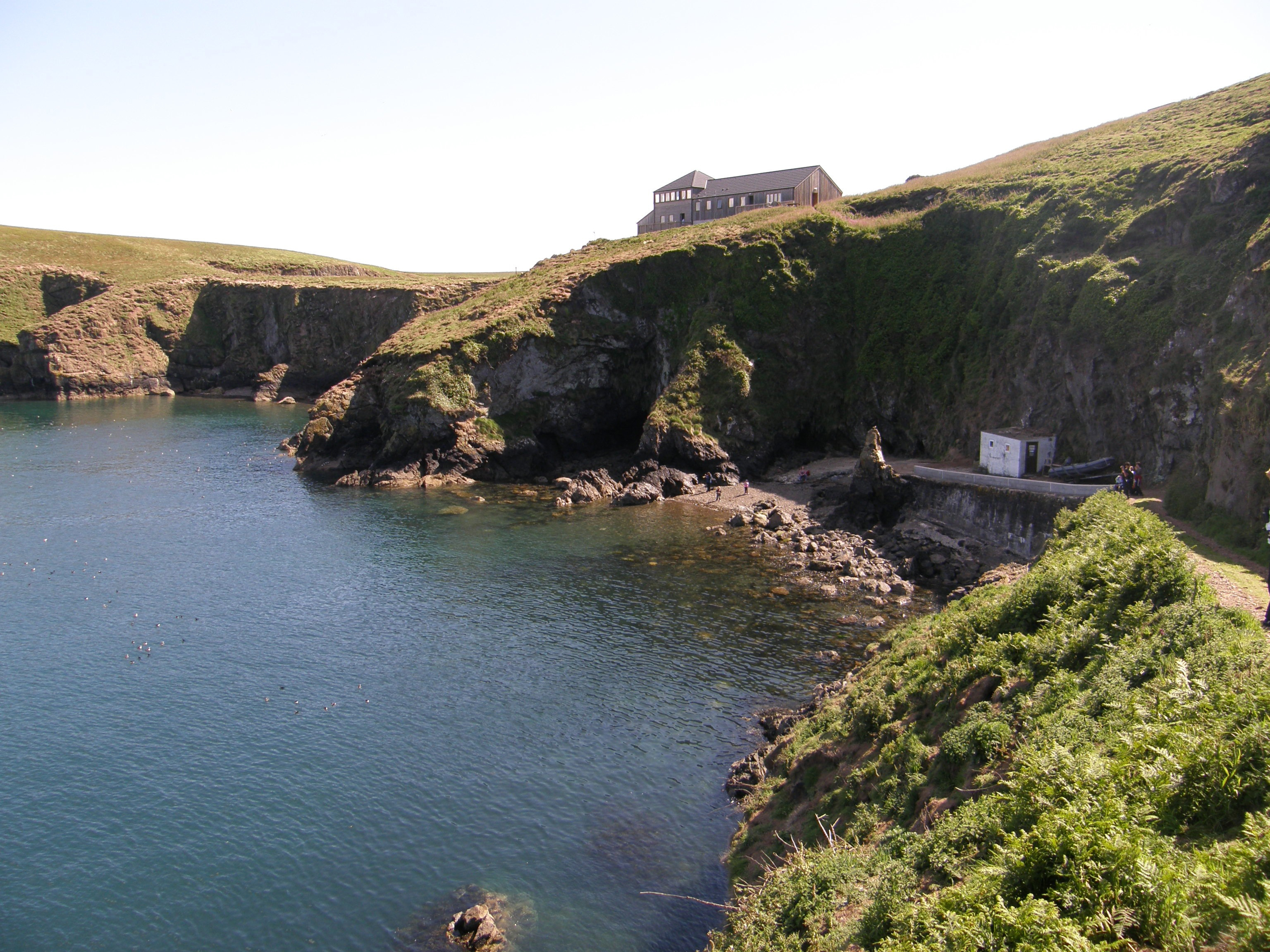
New warden's house and North Haven beach

The Dale Princess sails to Skomer from Martin's Haven on the mainland, a sheltered 15-minute trip every day (weather dependent) except Monday (Whitsun Bank Holiday Monday excepted) from April to September between 10am and noon (actual times may vary). There are limits on the number of people allowed to visit the island (250 per day). Advance booking is recommended after the introduction of a new visitor management system in 2020.

A self-catering hostel with 16 beds is situated at the farm in the centre of the island. Booking opens in October and can only be done by phoning the Tondu office. Overnight guests are brought over on a separate boat trip on the morning of their stay and the hostel is open April to September.

Areas open for visitor access are restricted to pathways. The Neck, an eastern area connected only by a narrow isthmus, is entirely out of bounds to visitors.

In 2005–06, there was a renovation project of the farm buildings which included the old barn for improved overnight visitor and research accommodation, the volunteers' quarters were rebuilt and the warden's house at North Haven was also rebuilt. Solar power provides hot water and electricity for lighting.

== See also ==
- Skomer Marine Conservation Zone
