= Jack Sound =

Body of water in west Wales

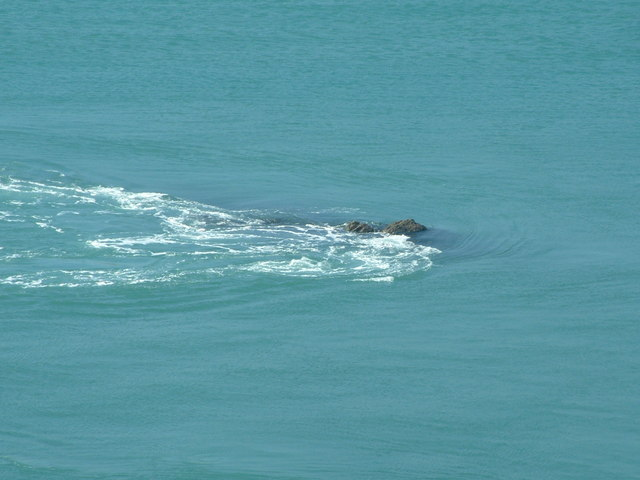

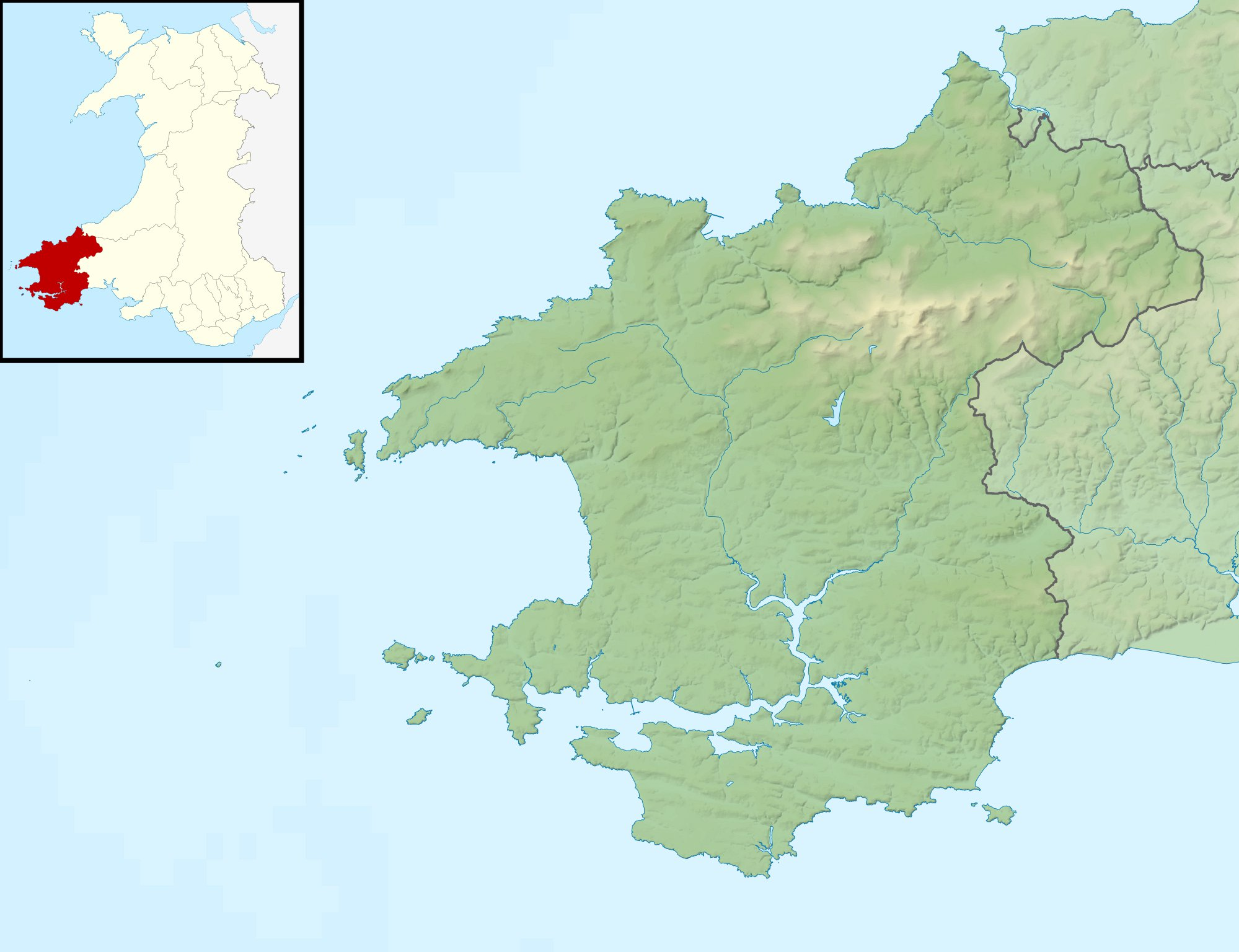
- Location within Pembrokeshire

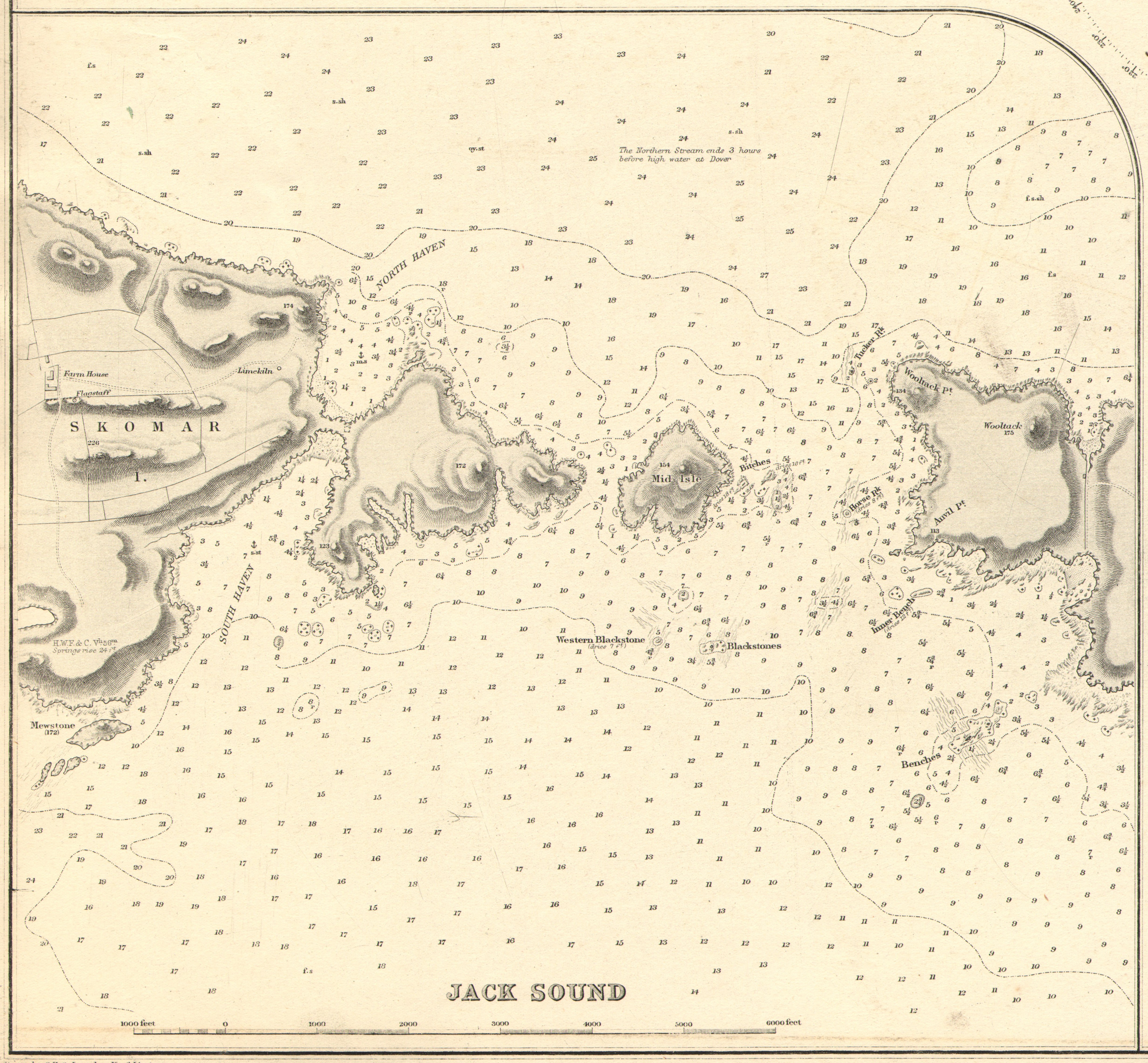
- Nautical chart of Jack Sound, 1878
- Location: Pembrokeshire, Wales
- Coordinates: 51.735°N 5.259°W

Jack Sound is a stretch of water between the island of Skomer and the Pembrokeshire coast in west Wales. It is popular with divers.

== Description ==
The 800 metres (2,600 ft) wide sound is used by boats to avoid a three-mile detour around the island, but it contains numerous reefs and a tidal race of up to 6 knots which consequently has resulted in numerous wrecks.

The sound is part of the Skomer Marine Conservation Zone.

== Recorded wrecks ==
The most popular wreck for divers is the MV Lucy, which sank in good condition in February 1967 after being abandoned by its crew owing to its cargo of calcium carbide. The Netherlands-registered coaster, 52 metres (171 ft), was en route from Uddevalla, Sweden to Barry.

Coflein, the Royal Commission's website records 32 wrecks associated with Jack Sound. One of these was the passenger ship Albion which struck rocks on passage through Jack Sound and was forced to beach further along the coast, where she remains.
