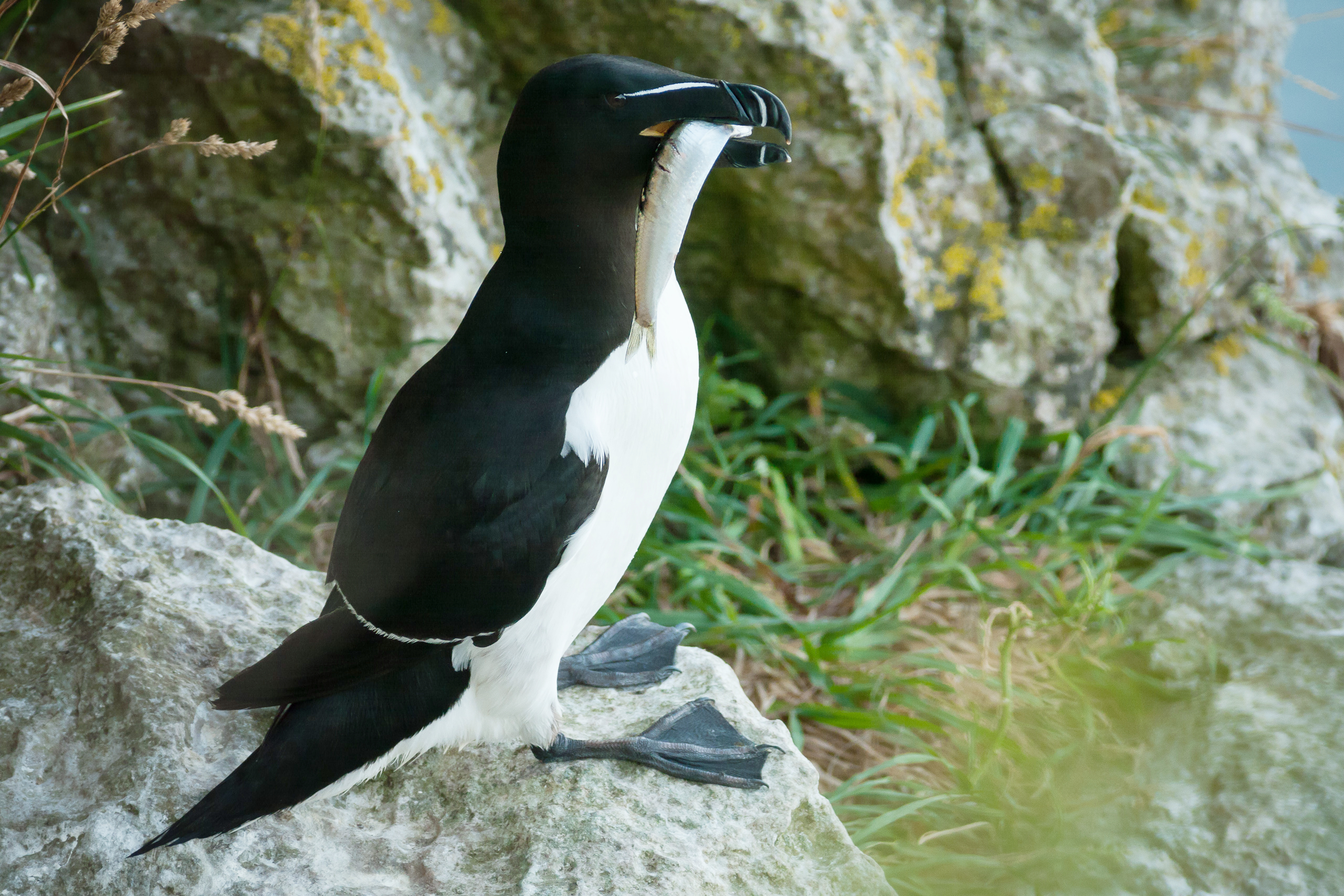
- Alca torda torda on Stora Karlsö, Gotland, Sweden
- Pair calling, at Skokholm, Wales

Conservation status
- Least Concern (IUCN 3.1)

- Apparently Secure (NatureServe)

Scientific classification
- Kingdom: Animalia
- Phylum: Chordata
- Class: Aves
- Order: Charadriiformes
- Family: Alcidae
- Genus: Alca
- Species: A. torda

Binomial name
- Alca torda Linnaeus, 1758

Subspecies
- A. t. torda - Linnaeus, 1758; A. t. islandica - Brehm, CL, 1831

= Razorbill =

Species of auk

The razorbill (Alca torda) is a North Atlantic colonial seabird and the only extant member of the genus Alca of the family Alcidae, the auks. It is the closest living relative of the extinct great auk (Pinguinus impennis). Historically, it has also been known as "auk", "razor-billed auk" and "lesser auk".

Razorbills are primarily black with a white underside. The male and female are identical in plumage; however, males are generally larger than females. This agile bird, which is capable of both flight and diving, has a predominantly aquatic lifestyle and only comes to land in order to breed. It is monogamous, choosing one partner for life. Females lay one egg per year. Razorbills nest along coastal cliffs in enclosed or slightly exposed crevices. The parents spend equal amounts of time incubating, and once the chick has hatched, they take turns foraging for their young.

Presently, this species faces major threats, including the destruction of breeding sites, oil spills, and deterioration of food quality. As a result, razorbills have on occasion been seen outside of their normal range as they search for alternative food sources. The IUCN records the population of the species as fluctuating. It decreased from 2015 to 2021, and appears to be increasing or stable at the present. It is estimated that the current global razorbill population lies between 838,000 and 1,600,000 mature individuals. In 1918, the razorbill was protected in the United States by the Migratory Bird Treaty Act.

== Taxonomy ==
A razorbill in flight

The genus Alca was formally described in 1758 by the Swedish naturalist Carl Linnaeus in the tenth edition of his Systema Naturae. The genus name Alca is from Norwegian Alke, and torda is from törd a Gotland Swedish dialect word; both terms refer to this species. The type locality is Stora Karlsö, just off the west coast of Gotland, Sweden. The word Alca had been used for the razorbill by earlier authors such as Carolus Clusius in 1605 and Francis Willughby in 1676.

The razorbill (Alca torda) is the sole living species in the genus Alca. Its close relative, the great auk (Pinguinus impennis), which became extinct in the mid-19th century, was also formerly included in the genus Alca. Razorbills and great auks are part of the tribe Alcini, which also includes the common murre or common guillemot (Uria aalge), the thick-billed murre or Brünnich's guillemot (Uria lomvia), and the little auk (Alle alle).

=== Fossil record ===
While the razorbill is the only living species, the genus Alca had a much higher diversity in the Pliocene. Some ornithologists also feel it is appropriate to retain the great auk in the genus Alca, instead of Pinguinus. A number of fossil forms have been found:

- Alca grandis (Late Miocene/Early Pliocene of Lee Creek Mine, US)
- Alca sp. (Late Miocene/Early Pliocene of Lee Creek Mine, US) - possibly A. stewarti
- Alca stewarti (Kattendijk Sands Early Pliocene of Belgium)
- Alca ausonia (Yorktown Early Pliocene of Lee Creek Mine, US - Middle Pliocene of Italy)
- Alca sp. (Puerto de Mazarrón Pliocene of El Alamillo, Spain) - may be A. antiqua or A. ausonia

As far as is known, the genus Alca seems to have evolved in the western North Atlantic or the present-day Caribbean like most other Alcini. Its ancestors would have reached these waters through the still-open Isthmus of Panama during the Miocene.

=== Subspecies ===
Two subspecies of razorbill accepted by the IOC:

Image	Subspecies	Distribution
Stora Karlsö, Gotland, Sweden	Alca torda torda Linnaeus 1758	the Baltic and White Seas, Norway, Bear Island, Greenland, and eastern North America.
Látrabjarg, Iceland (with Atlantic puffins to the right)	Alca torda islandica C.L. Brehm 1831	Iceland (type locality), Ireland, Great Britain, northwestern France, and Heligoland, Germany.

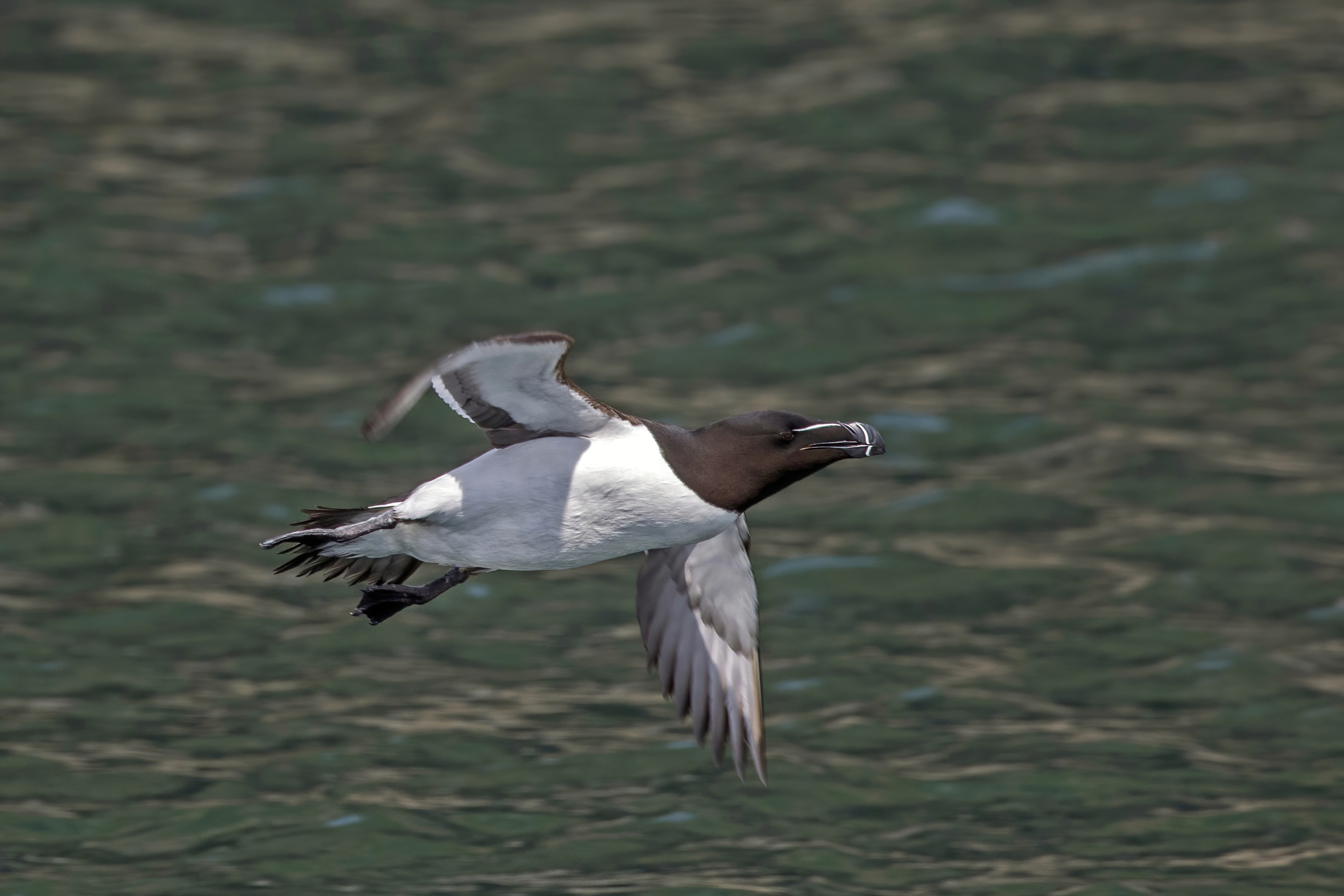
In flight off Skomer Island

The two subspecies differ slightly in size and bill measurements, with A. t. islandica, which occurs in warmer waters, being slightly smaller. A third subspecies Alca torda pica Linnaeus, 1766 (originally described as a species Alca pica from the Arctic, and reduced to subspecies by Salomonsen in 1944), is no longer accepted because the distinguishing characteristic, an additional furrow in the upper mandible, is now known to be age-related.

== Description ==
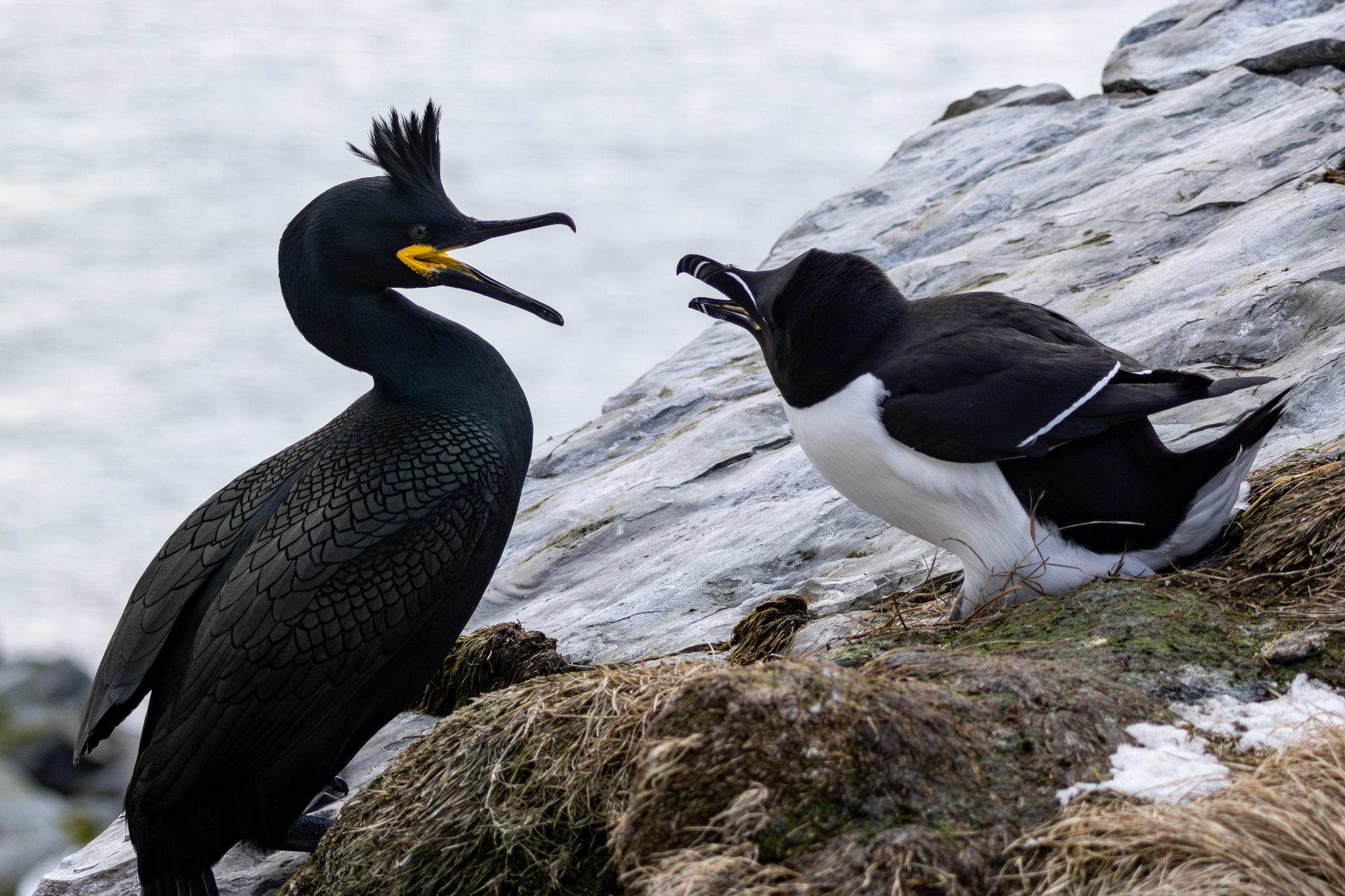
In conflict with a European shag, in Norway

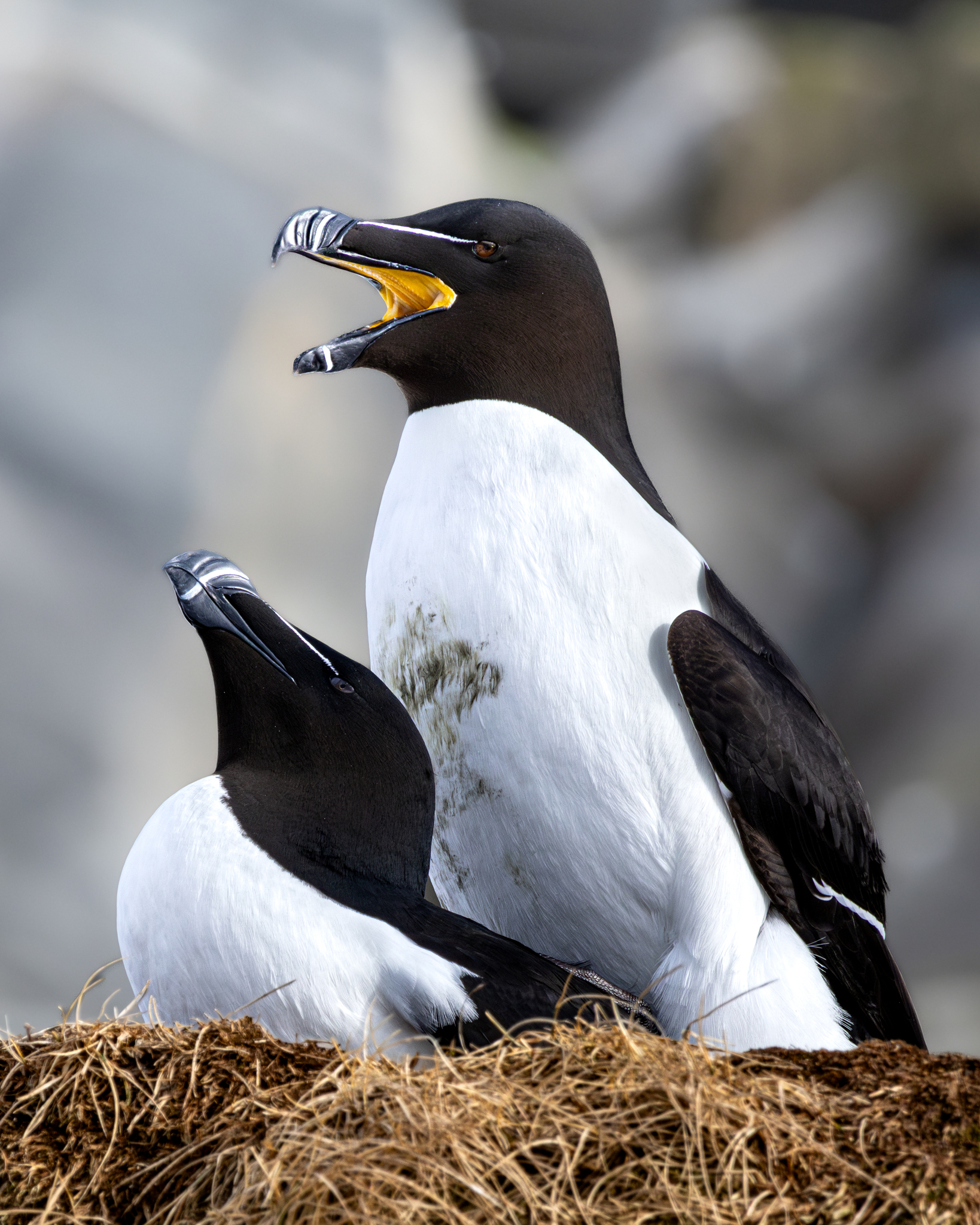
Showing the yellow mouth

The razorbill has a white belly and a black head, neck, back, and feet during the breeding season. A thin white line also extends from the eyes to the end of the bill. Its head is darker than that of a common murre. During the non-breeding season, the throat and face behind the eye become white, and the white line on the face and bill becomes less prominent. The bill is black, deep and laterally compressed, with a blunt end. It has several vertical grooves or furrows near the curved tip, one of them adorned with a white, broken vertical line. The bill is thinner and the grooves are less marked during the non-breeding season. It is a large and thick-set bird for an alcid, and its mean weight ranges from 505 to 890 g (17 3/4 to 31 1/2 oz). The female and male adults are very similar, having only small differences such as wing length. It is 37–39 cm in body length, the wing length of adult males ranges from 201–216 mm (7 15/16–8 1/2 in) while that of females ranges from 201 to 213 mm (7 15/16 to 8 3/8 in). During incubation, this species has a horizontal stance and the tail feathers are slightly longer in the center in comparison to other alcids. This makes the razorbill have a distinctly long tail which is not common for an auk. In-flight, the feet do not protrude beyond the tail.

Though the razorbill's average lifespan is roughly 13 years, a bird ringed in the UK in 1967 survived for at least 41 years, a record for the species.

== Distribution and habitat ==
Razorbills are distributed across the North Atlantic; the world population of razorbills is estimated to be at less than 1,000,000 breeding pairs. Approximately half of the breeding pairs occur in Iceland. Razorbills thrive at water surface temperatures below 15 °C (59 °F). They are often seen with the two larger auks, thick-billed murre and common murre. However, unlike other auks, they commonly move into larger estuaries with lower salinity levels to feed. These birds are distributed across sub-arctic and boreal waters of the Atlantic. Their breeding habitat is islands, rocky shores, and cliffs on northern Atlantic coasts, in eastern North America as far south as Maine, and in western Europe from northwestern Russia to northern France. North American birds migrate offshore and south, ranging from the Labrador Sea south to the Grand Banks of Newfoundland to New England. Eurasian birds also winter at sea, with multiple populations aggregating in the North Sea and some moving south as far as the western Mediterranean. Approximately 60 to 70% of the entire razorbill population breeds in Iceland.

Some razorbill colonies include (north to south):

- Hornøya, Norway (70°23' N) - 500 pairs.
- Grímsey, Iceland (66°33' N)
- Látrabjarg, Iceland (65°30' N) - 230,000 pairs, about 40% of the global population (mid-1990s estimate). Breeding season June – July.
- Runde, Norway (62°24' N) - 3,000 pairs.
- St Kilda, Scotland (57°49' N).
- Stora Karlsö, Gotland, Sweden (57°17' N), the type locality and the largest colony in the Baltic Sea, with 12,000 pairs in 2014–2015.
- Farne Islands, Northumberland, UK (55°38' N) - 523 pairs in 2022, breeding season May to mid-July.
- Bempton Cliffs, East Riding of Yorkshire, UK (54°14' N) - 30,673 pairs in 2022, pairs from March to mid-July.
- Skomer Island, Pembrokeshire, Wales.
- Heligoland, Germany (54°10' N) - a few pairs only.
- Gannet Islands, Canada (53°58' N) - 9,800 pairs.
- Funk Island, Canada (49°45' N).
- Île Rouzic, Brittany, France (48°54' N) - the southernmost limit in Europe; 600 pairs in 1960 but declining to just 30 pairs by 2006.
- Baccalieu Island, Canada (48°07' N).
- Witless Bay, Canada (47°13' N).
- Cape St. Mary's, Canada (46°49' N).

== Behavior ==
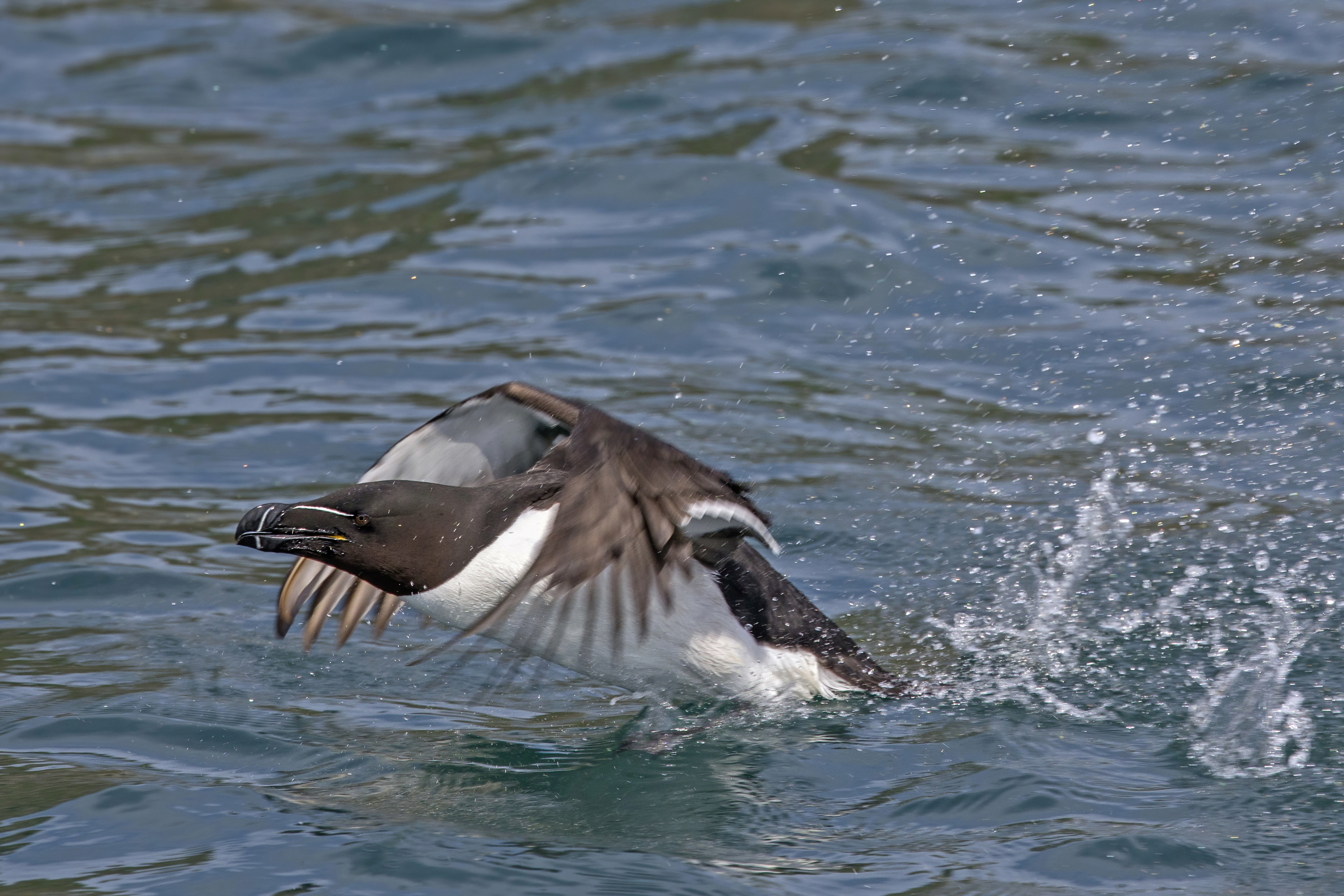
Taking off from water

The life-history traits of the razorbill are similar to that of the common murre. However, razorbills are slightly more agile. In North America it is a largely migratory seabird, as during the colder months, it leaves land and spends the entire winter in the waters of the Atlantic Ocean, though western European birds often remain close to their breeding sites.

During breeding, both males and females protect the nest. Females select their mate and will often encourage competition between males before choosing a partner. Once a male is chosen, the pair will stay together for life.

=== Reproduction ===
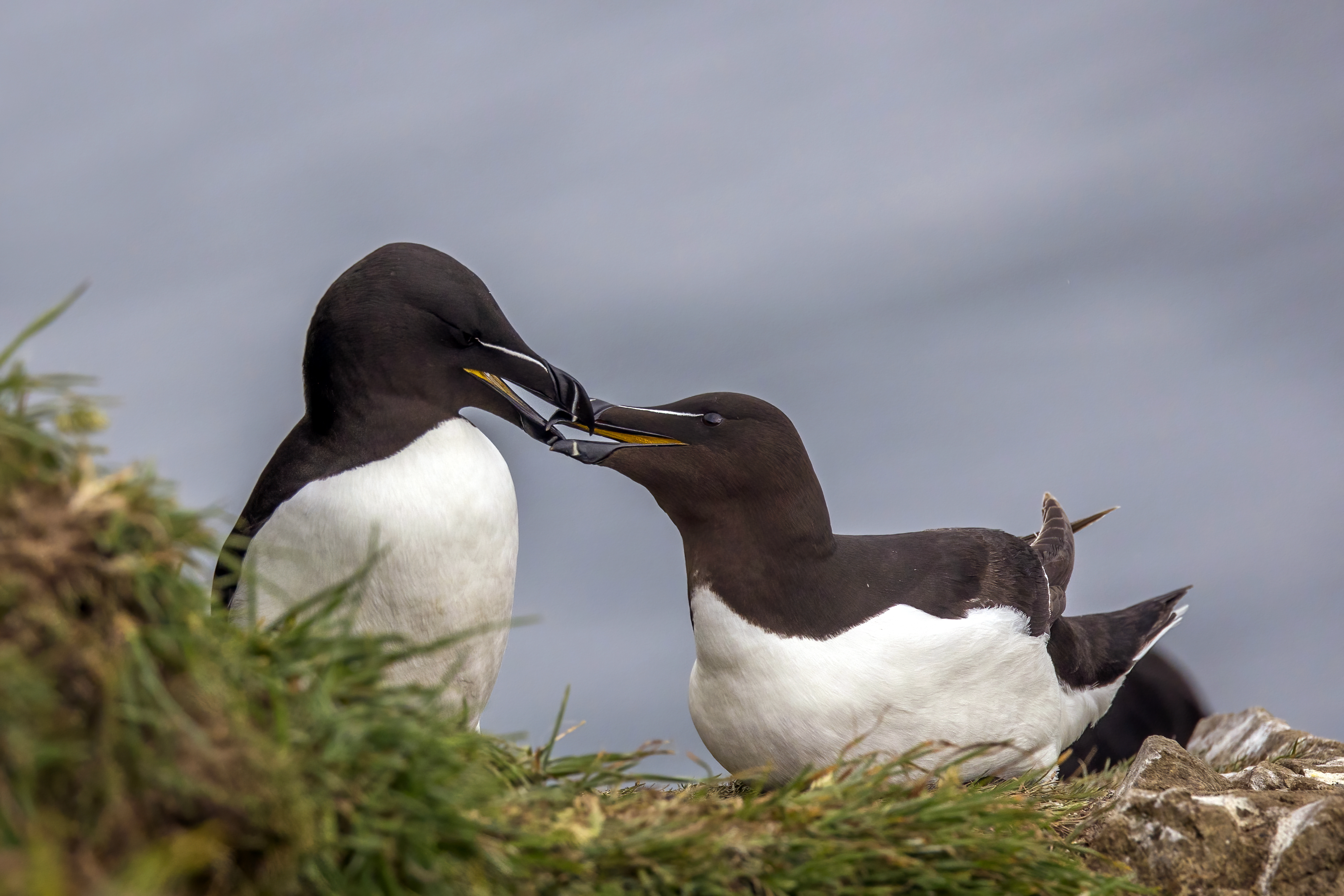
Courting on Skomer Island

Their mating system is female-enforced monogamy; the razorbill pairs for life. It nests in open or hidden crevices among cliffs and boulders. It is a colonial breeder and only comes to land to breed. The annual survival rate of the razorbill is between 89 and 95%.

Individuals only breed at 3–5 years old. As pairs grow older they will occasionally skip a year of breeding. A mating pair will court several times during breeding periods to strengthen their bond. Courtship displays include touching bills and following one another in elaborate flight patterns. Once the pre-laying period begins, males will constantly guard their mates by knocking other males away with their bills. The pair will mate up to 80 times in a 30-day period to ensure fertilisation. Females will sometimes encourage other males to engage in copulation to guarantee successful fecundity.

Throughout the pre-laying period, razorbills gather in large numbers. Two types of social behaviour occur; large groups dive and swim together in circles repeatedly and all rise up to the surface, heads first and bills open; secondly, large groups swim in a line weaving across each other in the same direction.

=== Nest sites ===
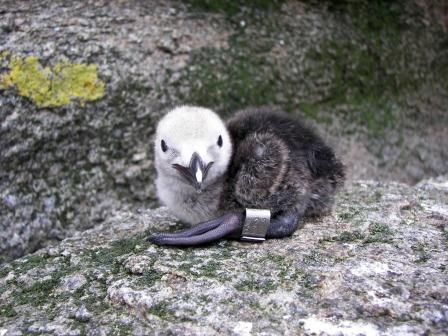
Ringed chick on Gannet Island, Labrador

Nest site choice is very important for these birds to ensure the protection of the young from predators. Unlike murres, nest sites are not immediately alongside the sea on open cliff ledges but at least 10 cm (4 in) away, in crevices on cliffs or among boulders. Nests are usually confined among the rocks or slightly more open. Some sites are along ledges, however, crevice sites seem to be more successful due to reduced predation.

The mating pair will often reuse the same site every year. Since chicks cannot fly, nests close to the sea provide easy access when leaving the colony. Generally, razorbills do not build a nest; however, some pairs may use their bills to drag material upon which to lay their egg. Nest under a boulder, rarely on an exposed ledge, may use Puffin or rabbit burrow. Although gregarious in breeding colonies, nests are not contiguous, but some metres apart, resulting in less aggression than in Guillemot colonies.

=== Incubation and hatching ===
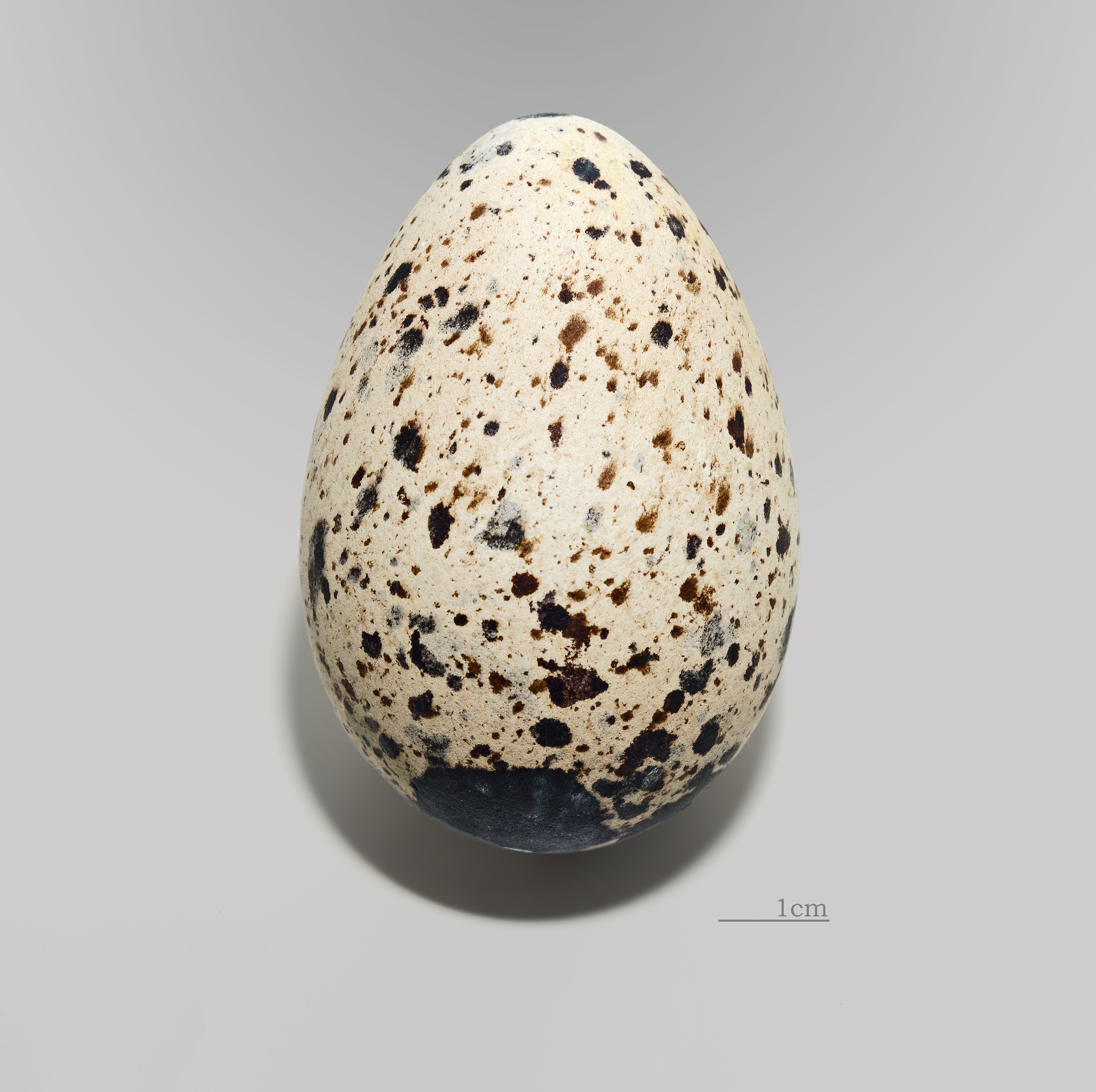
Egg

Females lay a single egg per year, usually from late April to May. The egg is an ovoid-pyramidal shape, creamy white to pale brown with has dark brown blotches. Incubation starts generally 48 hours after laying the egg. Females and males take turns incubating the egg several times daily for a total of approximately 35 days before hatching occurs. Razorbill chicks are semi-precocial. During the first two days after hatching, the chick will spend the majority of its time under the parent's wing. There is always one parent at the nest site while the other goes to sea to collect food for the chick. The hatchling develops a complete sheath 10 days after hatching. After 17–23 days, the chick leaves the nest by jumping from a cliff, closely followed by the male parent, who will accompany the chick to sea. During this time, the male parent will dive more than the female parent.

=== Feeding ===
Razorbills dive deep into the sea using their semi-folded wings and their streamlined bodies to propel themselves toward their prey. They keep their feet spread. While diving, they rarely stay in groups but rather spread out to feed. The majority of their feeding occurs at a depth of 25 m (80 ft) but they have the ability to dive up to 120 m (395 ft) below the surface. During a single dive, an individual can capture and swallow many schooling fish, depending on their size. Razorbills spend approximately 44% of their time foraging at sea.

When feeding their young, they generally deliver small loads. Adults will mainly feed only one fish to their chick with high feeding deliveries at dawn and decreased feeding 4 hours before dark. Females will generally feed their chicks more frequently than males. They may fly more than 100 km (60 mi) out to sea to feed when during egg incubation, but when provisioning the young, they forage closer to the nesting grounds, some 12 km (7 1/2 mi) away, and often in shallower water.

=== Diet ===
The diet of razorbill is very similar to that of a common murre or common guillemot. It consists generally of mid-water schooling fish such as capelin, sandeels, juvenile cod, sprats, and herring. It may also include crustaceans and polychaetes. A recent study suggests the diet is affected by local and regional environmental conditions in the marine environment.

== Predators ==
The adult razorbill has several predators which include great black-backed gulls, peregrine falcons, ravens, crows, and jackdaws. The general predators of their eggs are gulls and ravens. The best chance for adult razorbill to avoid predation is by diving. Arctic foxes and polar bears can also predate significant numbers of adults, eggs, and chicks in some years in the north of the species' range.

Razorbill eggs were collected until the late 1920s in Scotland's remote St Kilda islands by their men scaling the cliffs. The eggs were buried in St Kilda peat ash to be eaten through the cold, northern winters. The eggs were considered to taste like duck eggs in taste and nourishment.

== Conservation and management ==
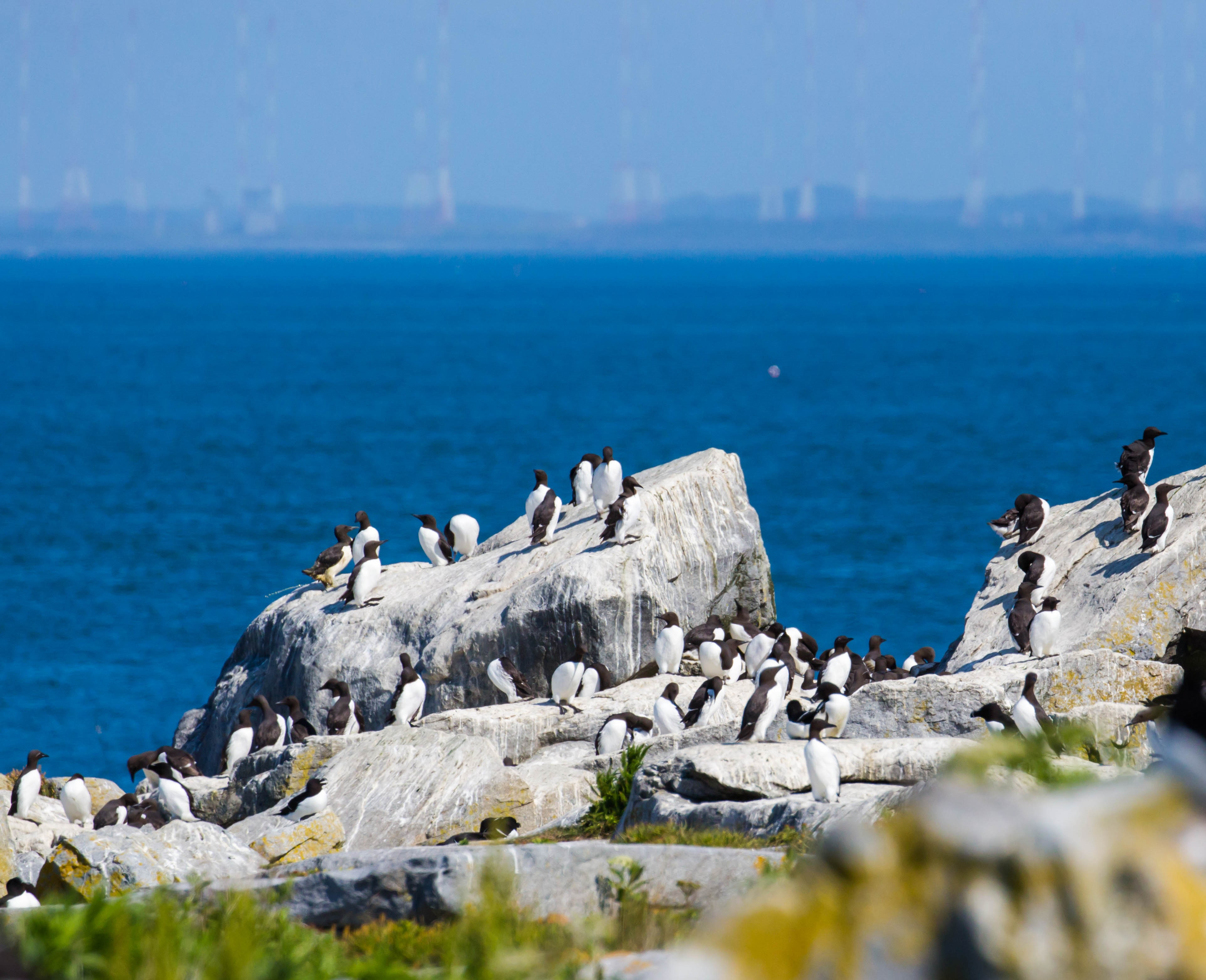
Razorbills on Machias Seal Island Migratory Bird Sanctuary

In the early 20th century, razorbills were harvested for eggs, meat, and feathers. This greatly decreased the global population. In the USA, they were finally protected by the 1917 Migratory Bird Treaty Act which reduced hunting. Other threatening interactions include oil pollution which can damage breeding sites. Any damage to breeding sites can reduce possible nest sites and affect the reproduction of the species. Commercial fishing affects populations because razorbills can become tangled in nets. Overfishing also decreases the abundance of razorbill prey and thus affects their survival.
