= Gannet Islands Ecological Reserve =

Canadian wildlife refuge

Gannet Islands
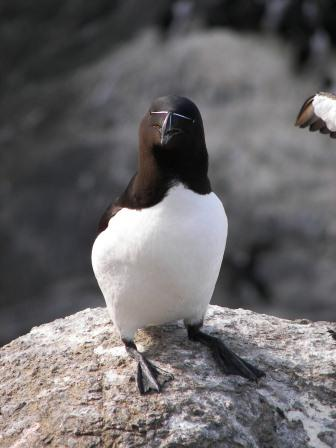
- A razorbill on Gannet Island

- Location within Newfoundland and Labrador

Geography
- Location: Labrador Sea
- Coordinates: 53.934°N 56.505°W
- Total islands: 7
- Major islands: 2
- Area: 2 km^{2} (0.77 sq mi)
- Highest elevation: 69 m (226 ft)

Administration
- Canada
- Province: Newfoundland and Labrador

Demographics
- Population: 0

The Gannet Islands Ecological Reserve is a remote wildlife refuge in the Labrador Sea.

The Gannet Islands are a group of islands approximately 40 km northeast of Cartwright. The islands are named after the British survey ship HMS Gannet.

The reserve is home to the largest razorbill colony in North America and the third largest breeding colony of Atlantic puffins.
