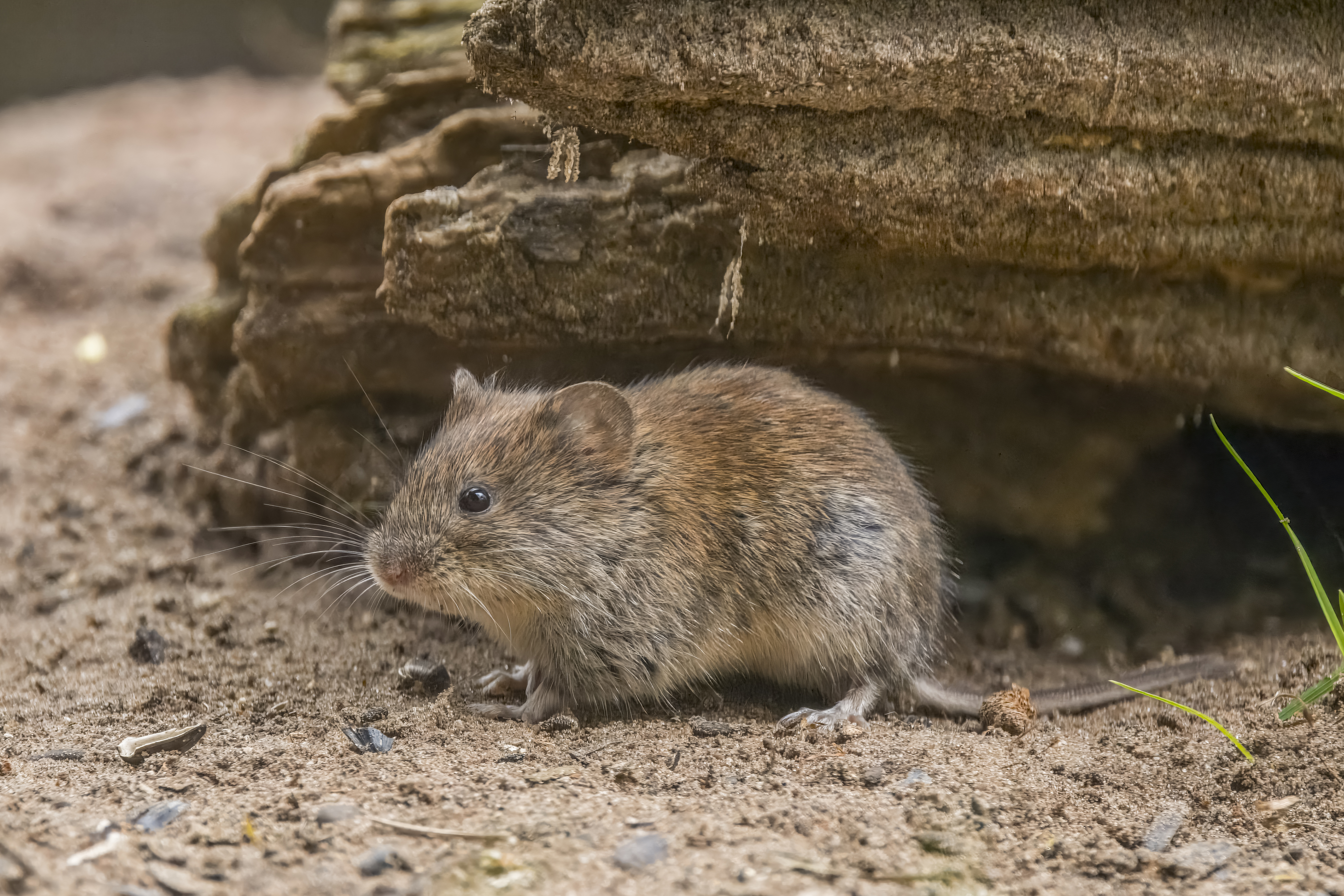

Conservation status
- Least Concern (IUCN 3.1)

Scientific classification
- Kingdom: Animalia
- Phylum: Chordata
- Class: Mammalia
- Order: Rodentia
- Family: Cricetidae
- Subfamily: Arvicolinae
- Genus: Clethrionomys
- Species: C. glareolus

Binomial name
- Clethrionomys glareolus (Schreber, 1780)
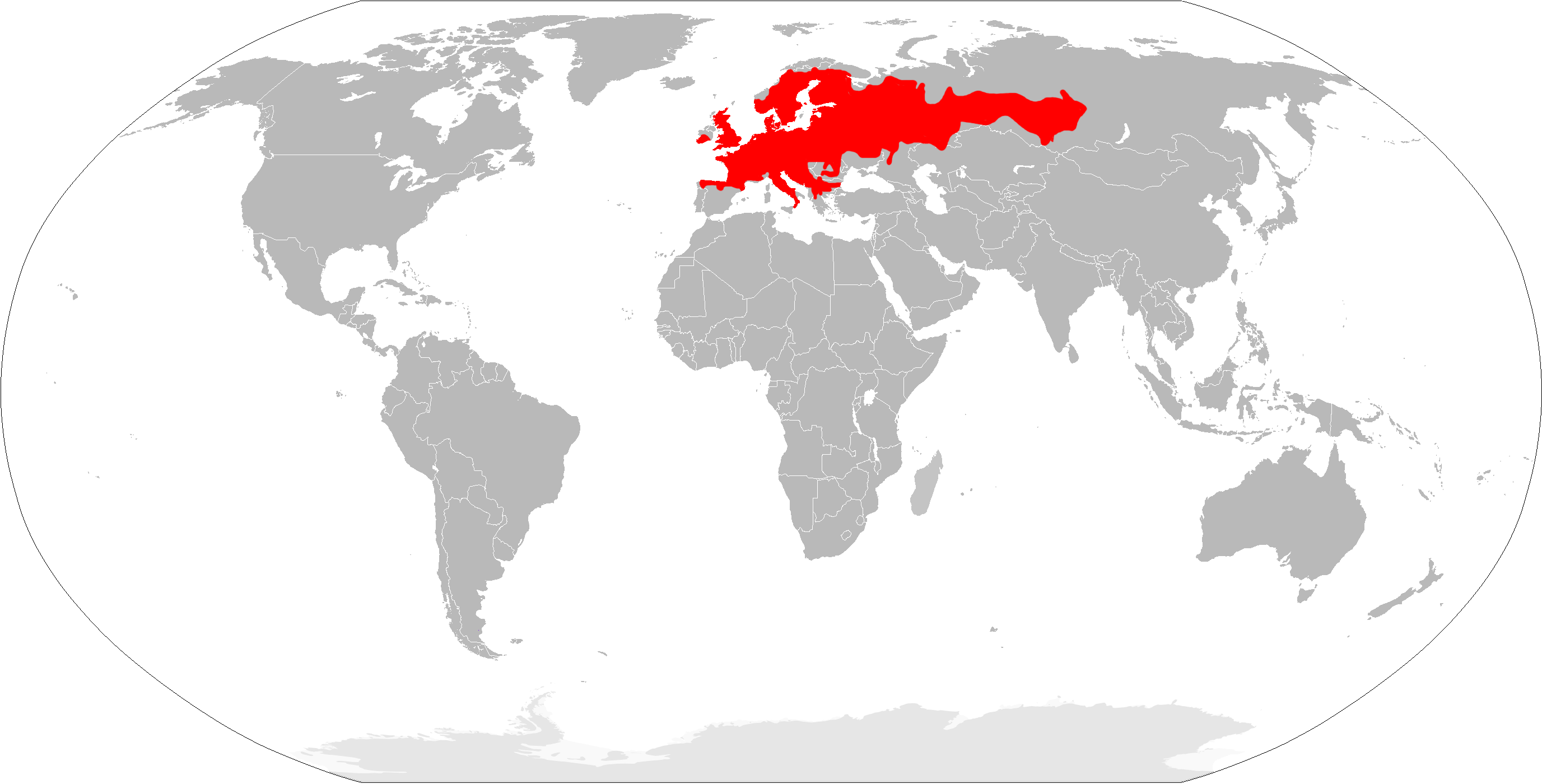
- Range of bank vole

Synonyms
- List: Myodes glareolus (Schreber, 1780); Evotomys glareolus (Schreber, 1780); Mus glareolus Schreber, 1780; Arvicola fulvus Millet, 1828; Arvicola pratensis Bell, 1837; Arvicola riparia Yarrell, 1832; Myodes alstoni (Barrett-Hamilton & Hinton, 1913); Myodes arvalis (Geoffroy, 1803); Myodes bernisi (Rey, 1972); Myodes bicolor (Fatio, 1862); Myodes bosniensis (Martino, 1945); Myodes britannicus (Miller, 1900); Myodes caesarius (Miller, 1908); Myodes cantueli (Saint Girons, 1969); Myodes curcio (Lehman, 1961); Myodes devius (Stroganov, 1948); Myodes erica (Barrett-Hamilton, 1913); Myodes garganicus (Hagen, 1958); Myodes gorka (Montagu, 1923); Myodes hallucalis (Thomas, 1906); Myodes harrisoni (Hinton, 1926); Myodes helveticus (Miller, 1900); Myodes hercynicus (Mehlis, 1831); Myodes insulaebellae (Heim de Balsac, 1940); Myodes intermedius (Burg, 1923); Myodes kennardi (Hinton, 1926); Myodes makedonicus (Felten & Storch, 1965); Myodes minor (Kerr, 1792); Myodes nageri (Schinz, 1845); Myodes norvegicus (Miller, 1900); Myodes ognevi (Serebrennikov, 1927); Myodes petrovi (Martino, 1945); Myodes pirenaica (Cabrera, 1924); Myodes pirinus (Wolf, 1940); Myodes ponticus (Thomas, 1906); Myodes pratensis (Baillon, 1834); Myodes reinwaldti (Hinton, 1921); Myodes rubidus (Baillon, 1834); Myodes rufescens (de Sélys Longchamps, 1834); Myodes ruttneri (Wettstein, 1926); Myodes saianicus (Thomas, 1911); Myodes sibiricus (Egorin, 1936); Myodes skomerensis (Barrett-Hamilton, 1903); Myodes sobrus (Montagu, 1923); Myodes suecicus (Miller, 1900); Myodes tomensis (Heptner, 1948); Myodes variscicus (Wettstein, 1954); Myodes vasconiae (Miller, 1900); Myodes vesanus (Hinton, 1926); Myodes wasjuganensis (Egorin, 1939)

= Bank vole =

Species of rodent

The bank vole (Clethrionomys glareolus) is a small vole with red-brown fur and some grey patches, with a tail about half as long as its body. A rodent, it lives in woodland areas and is around 100 millimetres (3.9 in) in length. The bank vole is found in much of Europe and in northwestern Asia. It is native to Great Britain but not to Ireland, where it has been accidentally introduced, and has now colonised much of the south and southwest.

The bank vole lives in woodland, hedgerows and other dense vegetation, such as bracken and bramble. Its underground chamber is lined with moss, feathers and vegetable fibre and contains a store of food. It can live for eighteen months to two years in the wild and over 42 months in captivity and is mostly herbivorous, eating buds, bark, seeds, nuts, leaves and fruits and occasionally insects and other small invertebrates. It readily climbs into scrub and low branches of trees although it is not as versatile as a mouse. It breeds in shallow burrows, the female rearing about four litters of pups during the summer.

== Description ==
The bank vole is a small rodent resembling a mouse when young but developing a stouter body, a slightly rounder head with smaller ears and eyes and a shorter, hairy tail. The dorsal surface is reddish-brown, with a greyish undercoat and the flanks are grey with a reddish-brown sheen. The underparts are whitish-grey sometimes tinged with dull yellow. The ears are larger than those of most voles. The adult head and body length varies between 3.25 and 4.75 inches (83 and 121 mm) and the tail ranges from 1.5 to 3 inches (38 to 76 mm). The weight is between 15.4 and 36 grams (0.54 and 1.27 oz). Young animals are darker in colour with greyer underparts. The bank vole is capable of making growling sounds and can utter low-pitched squeaks. In a case of distress and isolation it has been witnessed to emit a sound resembling that of a human sob.

In areas such as Great Britain, where the only other small vole is the short-tailed vole (Microtus agrestis), the bank vole is distinguished by its more prominent ears, chestnut-brown fur and longer tail which is usually 50% body length. The northern red-backed vole (C. rutilus) from northern Scandinavia and Russia has a shorter tail and is paler with less grey in its pelage. The grey red-backed vole (Craseomys rufocanus) from northern Eurasia is larger with a distinctive reddish back.

== Distribution ==
The bank vole has a Palearctic distribution. It is native to Europe, Asia Minor and parts of Western Siberia. It does not occur in Iceland or northern Fenno-Scandia (except for Finland) and is absent from most of the Iberian Peninsula and parts of Italy and the Balkans. It was introduced into southwestern Ireland in the 1950s, and there are fears that it may be displacing the native wood mouse (Apodemus sylvaticus). A subspecies found on the island of Skomer in West Wales, the Skomer vole (C. g. skomerensis), is much larger than the mainland bank vole, and there may be 20,000 individuals on the island in late summer.

== Habitat ==
The bank vole is found in forests, especially in deciduous and mixed woodland with scrub, low plants and leaf litter. It is also present in hedgerows, field verges, among bracken and brambles, river banks, swamps and parks. In mountainous regions and the northern part of its range it occurs in coniferous woodland at altitudes of up to 1,800 metres (5,900 ft). It is not found on bare soil and ample ground cover seems a necessity. In the Mediterranean region, at the southern extent of its range, it is a habitat specialist and is found in moist woodland but not in grassland and bushy places. At the fringes of forested areas it is possible for there to be a metapopulation consisting of a number of spatially separated populations of bank vole that come and go according to the season and local events. Some areas may be devoid of voles during the winter and be repopulated during the summer only to become empty of voles again in October. The further from permanently inhabited forest the location is, the fewer females there are and the more widely the number of individuals fluctuates.

== Behaviour ==
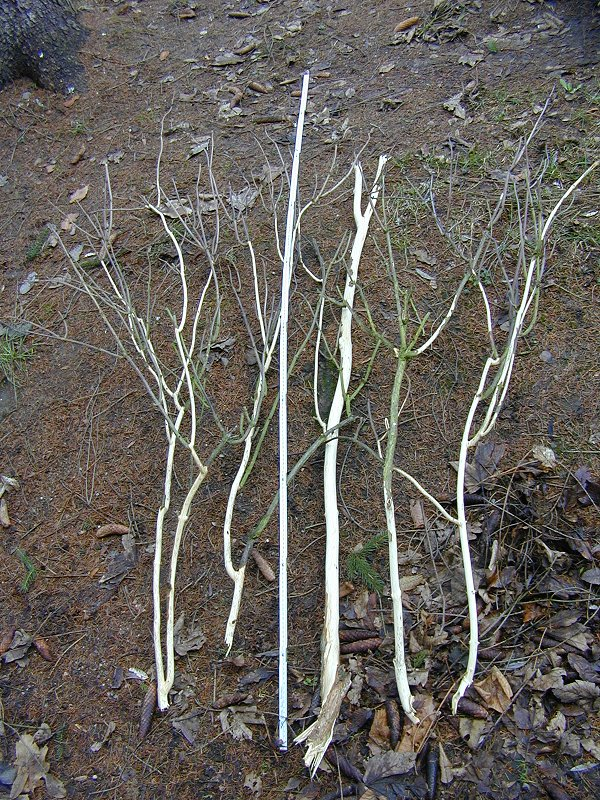
Twigs of elder (Sambucus nigra) damaged by the bank vole

The bank vole is active by day and also at night. It does not hibernate in winter. It excavates long, shallow branching burrows with multiple exits, sometimes tunnelling along beneath the leaf litter. It gathers and stores food underground and makes a nest with moss, dry grasses and leaves close to the surface or even above ground. It is in general quite bold but is also very alert to the cries of other animals such as tits (bird) warning of aerial predators.

The bank vole is primarily a herbivore. Its diet varies with the season but usually consists of leaves, grasses, roots, buds, bark, fruits, nuts, grain and seeds. When feeding on grass stalks it may clip the stalks and lay the cut pieces in piles. Some food is carried back to the burrow where it is kept in dedicated storage chambers. It sometimes eats animal food in the form of insects, spiders and worms and may take eggs from the nests of birds nesting on the ground.

The bank vole climbs well and in the winter it feeds on the bark of trees including beeches, maples and larch up to several metres above the ground. It also eats tree seedlings and reduces the natural regeneration of woodland. When present in large numbers, it is considered a forest pest. However, its harmfulness is relatively low in a healthy ecosystem because significant damage only occurs when numbers build up, and because it has a large number of natural enemies its population is normally kept under control.

Females are typically larger than males, but male-bias sexual dimorphism occurs in alpine populations, possibly because of the lack of predators and greater competition between males.

== Breeding ==
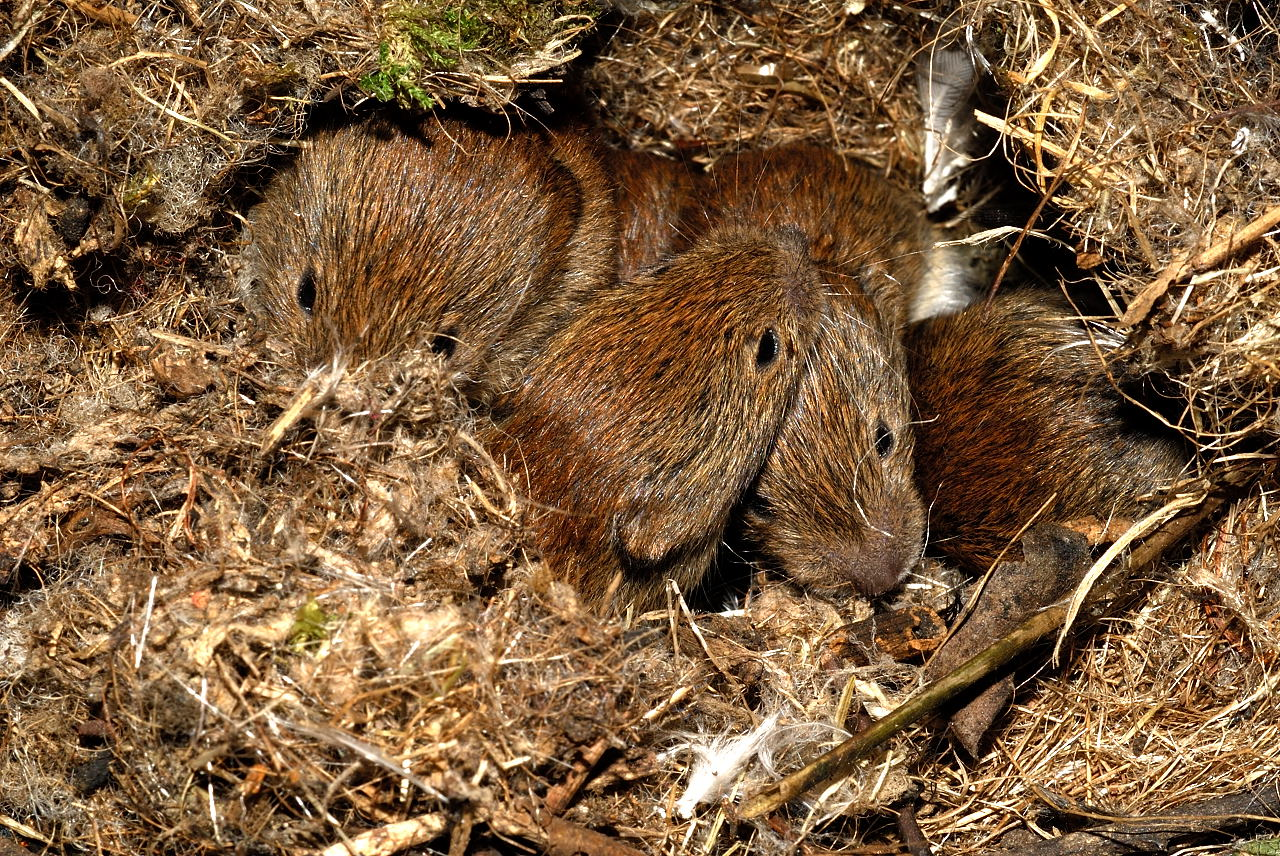
Young bank voles in their nest beneath a wood pile

Females maintain territories which may overlap somewhat, and males occupy larger territories covering those of several females. The home range of females is usually between 500 and 2,000 square metres (5,400 and 21,500 sq ft). The breeding season lasts from late April to September. Females appear to prefer dominant males and may actively avoid other vagrant males. The gestation period averages 21 days, being longer if the female is still lactating from a previous litter. A litter can be up to ten pups but the average number is four to eight. Females sometimes kill pups in burrows in adjoining territories and males sometimes kill pups before mating with their mother, perhaps as a tactic to ensure his offspring are advantaged. The pups are naked and helpless and their eyes open at about nine days. They are weaned at 20 to 25 days and the females become sexually mature by six weeks with the males reaching maturity by eight weeks. There may be up to four litters per year and as the youngsters start to breed, numbers quickly build up over the summer months. The bank vole lives for up to two years in the wild. In captivity this can increase to over 42 months, with the older voles tending to spend most time resting, less physically agile, though still capable of having a spin on the wheel.

Male bank voles exhibit inbreeding avoidance behavior, finding nonsibling females more attractive than siblings.

== Ecology ==
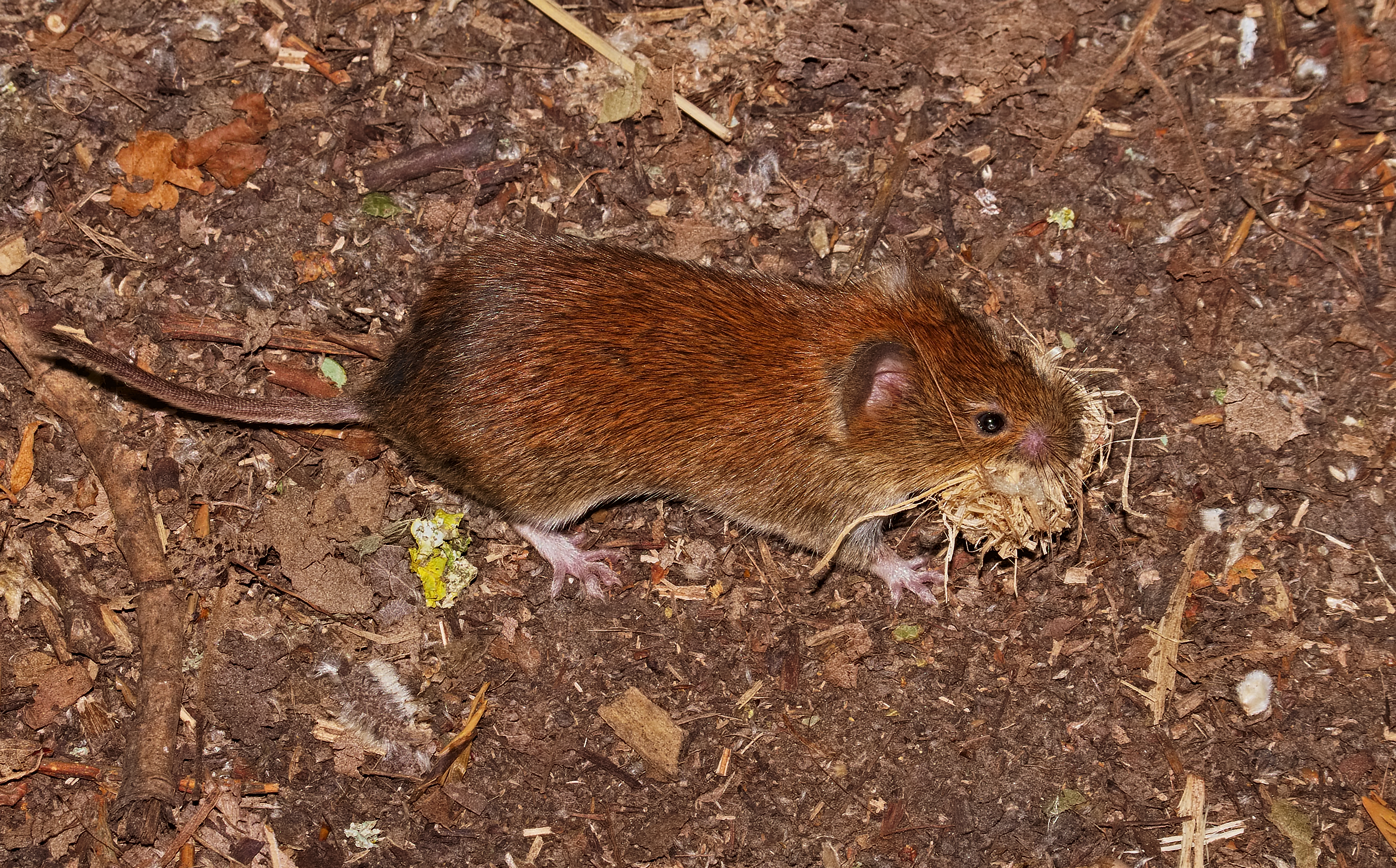
Bank vole carrying nest material

The bank vole is plentiful during much of the year and plays an important part in the diet of various predators including the red fox (Vulpes vulpes), the stoat (Mustela erminea), the least weasel (M. nivalis), the European mink (M. lutreola), the common kestrel (Falco tinnunculus), the rough-legged buzzard (Buteo lagopus) and the tawny owl (Strix aluco). The voles try to prevent being caught by avoiding open areas of ground, by using tunnels and well-worn paths through the undergrowth.

The bank vole acts as a reservoir of infection for the Puumala virus, which can infect humans, causing a haemorrhagic fever known as nephropathia epidemica and, in extreme cases, even death. Although this hantavirus has co-evolved with its host, its presence among populations seems to decrease their over-winter survival rates.

== Status ==
The bank vole has a very wide range across Europe and western Asia. The population density depends on the time of year and location and varies between six and one hundred individuals per hectare. The population size varies from year to year but in the long term appears to be stable. For these reasons, the International Union for Conservation of Nature has rated the bank vole as being of "Least Concern" in its Red List of Threatened Species. When it lives on road verges, the bank vole can suffer from lead toxicity and near farmland it may be affected by pesticides, molluscicides and rodenticides.

== Research ==
Bank voles are used in studying prion disease as they are susceptible to prions from many species. Bank vole PrP^{C} has distinct amino acid residues that are thought to promote both spontaneous and template-driven misfolding.
