= Skomer vole =

Scientific classification
- Kingdom: Animalia
- Phylum: Chordata
- Class: Mammalia
- Order: Rodentia
- Family: Cricetidae
- Subfamily: Arvicolinae
- Genus: Clethrionomys
- Species: C. glareolus
- Subspecies: C. g. skomerensis

Trinomial name
- Clethrionomys glareolus skomerensis (Barrett-Hamilton, 1903)

Subspecies of rodent

The Skomer vole (Clethrionomys glareolus skomerensis) is a subspecies of bank vole endemic to the island of Skomer, off the west coast of Wales. The bank vole was probably introduced by humans at some time after the last glaciation. It is one of four small mammal species on Skomer. There are approximately 20,000 voles on the island. The vole's main predators are owls, but it is also eaten by other predators, including common kestrel, common buzzard and peregrine falcon. Like other voles they are short-lived, surviving to around 18 months old at most. At their largest they are roughly 12 centimetres (4.7 in) long and weigh a maximum of 40 grams (1.4 oz).

== Discovery ==
The Skomer vole was discovered by Robert Drane (d. 1914), a pharmacist born in Guestwick, Norfolk, but lived in Cardiff, who was a founding member of the Cardiff Naturalists' Society in 1867, and at sometime its president, and also an authority on porcelain and honorary curator of Cardiff Museum.
