= Verrucoplaca =

Scientific classification
- Kingdom: Fungi
- Division: Ascomycota
- Class: Lecanoromycetes
- Order: Teloschistales
- Family: Teloschistaceae
- Genus: Verrucoplaca; S.Y.Kondr., Kärnefelt, Elix, A.Thell & Hur (2014)
- Species: V. verruculifera

Binomial name
- Verrucoplaca verruculifera (Vain.) S.Y.Kondr., Kärnefelt, Elix, A.Thell, Jung Kim, M.H.Jeong, N.N.Yu, A.S.Kondr. & Hur (2014)

Synonyms
- Placodium verruculiferum Vain. (1905); Caloplaca verruculifera (Vain.) Zahlbr. (1931); Gasparrinia verruculifera (Vain.) Dombr. (1970); Polycauliona verruculifera (Vain.) Arup, Frödén & Søchting (2013)

Species of lichen

Verrucoplaca is a monotypic fungal genus in the family Teloschistaceae. It contains the single species Verrucoplaca verruculifera, a widely distributed saxicolous (rock-dwelling), crustose lichen that grows on coastal rocks.

== Taxonomy ==
The genus Verrucoplaca was circumscribed in 2014 by the lichenologists Sergey Kondratyuk, Ingvar Kärnefelt, John Alan Elix, Arne Thell, and Jae-Seoun Hur, following a molecular phylogenetics-led restructuring of the subfamily Xanthorioideae. The type species was originally described in 1905 by Finnish lichenologist Edvard August Vainio as a species of Placodium, and it was later proposed for inclusion in the genera Caloplaca, Gasparrinia, and Polycauliona.

== Description ==
Verrucoplaca is characterized by a thallus with a rosette-like structure with lobes. It contains secondary chemical compounds known as anthraquinones. Its cortical layer, which is the protective outer layer, is structured in a palisade plectenchymatous manner. The apothecia are of the zeorine type. Within the apothecia, the layer beneath the spore-producing surface, known as the subhymenium, is dotted with oil droplets. Verrucoplaca has a distinctive true exciple, a protective rim around the apothecia. The lichen produces conidia (asexual spores) that are narrowly oval in shape. A primary distinguishing chemical component of this genus are the anthraquinones associated with the parietin chemosyndrome.

== Habitat and distribution ==
Verrucoplaca verruculifera is a widely distributed, strictly coastal species, typically found in littoral zones. It has a more or less circumpolar distribution in the Arctic, but also extends into boreal and temperate regions of Europe, the Russian Far East, Asia, and both coasts of North America.
