= Viator picis =

Viator picis Temporal range: Upper Pleistocene

Scientific classification
- Domain: Eukaryota
- Kingdom: Animalia
- Phylum: Chordata
- Class: Aves
- Order: Charadriiformes
- Family: Charadriidae
- Genus: †Viator; Campbell, 1979
- Species: †V. picis

Binomial name
- †Viator picis Campbell, 1979

Extinct species of bird

Viator picis is an extinct genus and species of lapwing (Charadriiformes; Charadriidae; Vanellinae) known only from the upper Pleistocene asphalt deposits known as the Talara Tar Seeps, which are found near Talara, northwestern Peru. It was described by Campbell (1979). Although it appears to be related to the southern lapwing (Belonopterus chilensis) and the Andean lapwing (Belonopterus resplendens), it is quite distinct from Vanellus sensu stricto; however, most authorities now include the former two species in an expanded Vanellus which includes all lapwings, in which case Viator picis may belong in Vanellus as well.
