= Malagasy lapwing =

Malagasy lapwing Temporal range: Late Holocene

Conservation status
- Extinct

Scientific classification
- Domain: Eukaryota
- Kingdom: Animalia
- Phylum: Chordata
- Class: Aves
- Order: Charadriiformes
- Family: Charadriidae
- Genus: Vanellus
- Species: †V. madagascariensis

Binomial name
- †Vanellus madagascariensis Goodman, 1997

Extinct species of bird

The Malagasy lapwing (Vanellus madagascariensis) is an extinct type of wader/shorebird, in the lapwing family.

== Description ==
It is known only from two subfossil humeri, found in separate locales in south-western Madagascar, which were described by Steven M. Goodman.

The species is notable for the huge carpal spurs that it sported on its wings, the largest spurs of any lapwing species both in relative and absolute size.

== Estimated time of extinction ==
Radiocarbon dating has indicated that the species became extinct in the 14th century, during a period of climatic aridification.
