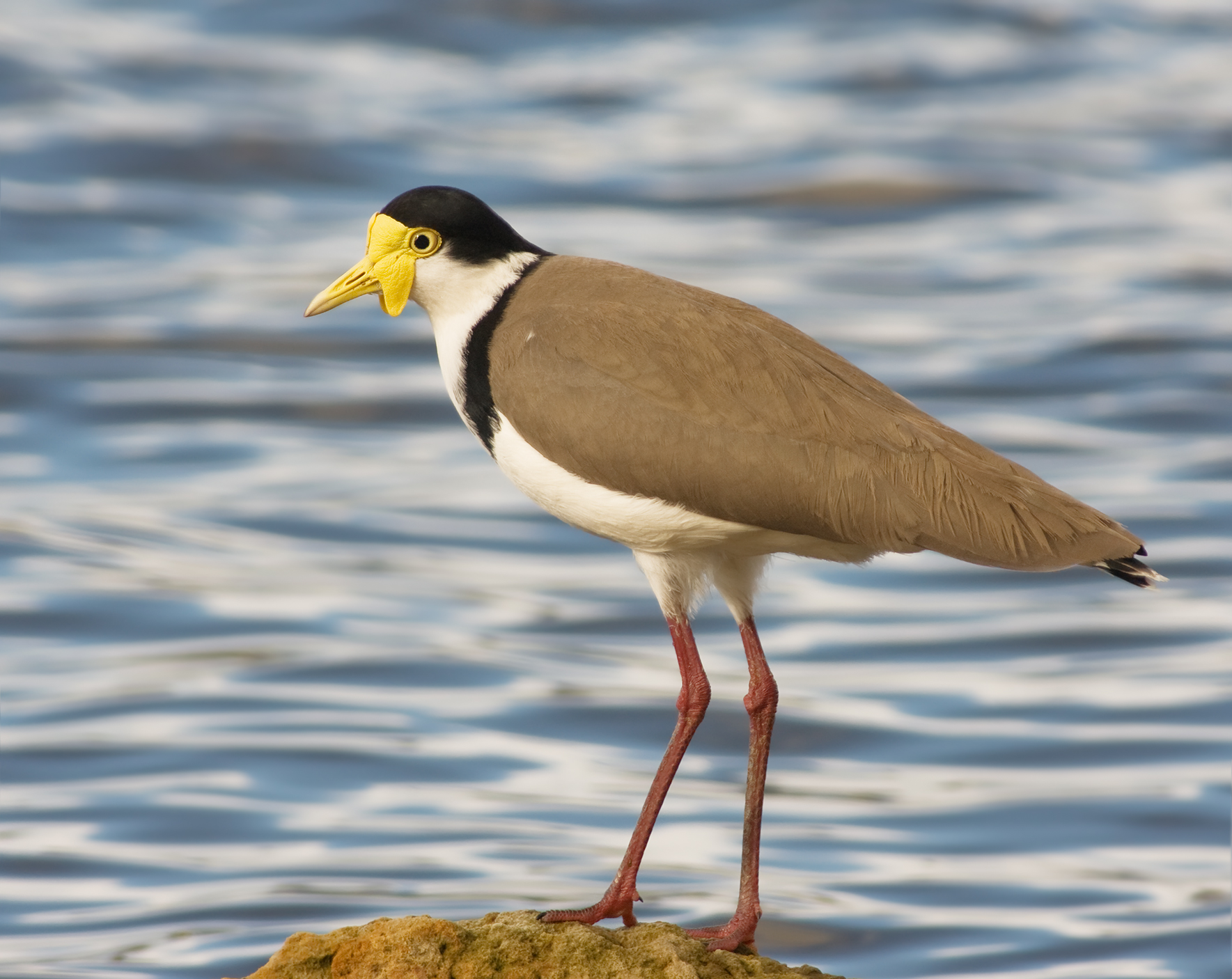
- Vanellus miles novaehollandiae
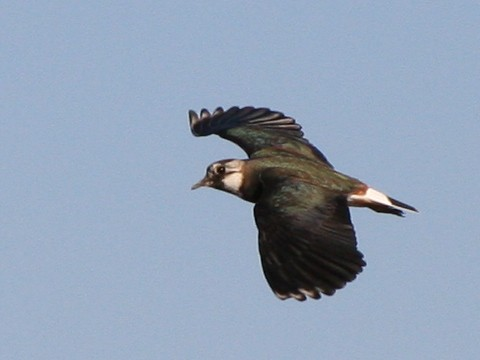
- Vanellus vanellus

Scientific classification
- Kingdom: Animalia
- Phylum: Chordata
- Class: Aves
- Order: Charadriiformes
- Family: Charadriidae
- Subfamily: Vanellinae
- Genus: Vanellus; Brisson, 1760

Type species
- Tringa vanellus Linnaeus, 1758

Species
- 24, see text

Synonyms
- List: Afribyx Mathews, 1913 Anomalophrys Sharpe, 1896; Anitibyx Wolters, 1974; Belonopterus Reichenbach, [1852]; Chaetusia Agassiz, 1846 (unjustified emendation); Cheltusia Verreaux, 1855 (unjustified emendation); Chettusia Bonaparte, 1838; Chetusia Gray, 1841 (unjustified emendation); Choetusia Blyth, 1854 (unjustified emendation); Dorypaltus Brodkorb, 1959; Hemiparra Salvadori, 1865; Hoplopterus Bonaparte, 1831; Hoploxypterus Bonaparte, 1856; Lobibyx Heine [1890]; Lobipluria Bonaparte, 1856 (lapsus); Lobipluvia Bonaparte, 1856; Lobivanellus Strickland 1841; Microsarcops Sharpe 1896; Ptiloscelys Bonaparte, 1856; Sarciophorus Strickland 1841; Stephanibyx Reichenbach, [1852]; Rogibyx Mathews 1913; Tylibyx Reichenbach, [1852]; Vanellochettusia Brandt 1852; Xiphidiopterus Reichenbach, [1852] and see text

= Vanellus =

Genus of birds

Vanellus is the genus of waders which provisionally contains all lapwings except red-kneed dotterel, Erythrogonys cinctus. The name "vanellus" is Latin for "little fan", vanellus being the diminutive of vannus ("winnowing fan"). The name is in reference to the sound lapwings' wings make in flight.

== Description ==
These long-legged waders mostly have strongly patterned plumage. Although the most familiar Eurasian lapwing, Vanellus vanellus (northern lapwing), has a wispy crest, only two other species do so. Red or yellow facial wattles are a more typical decoration.

Only northern, sociable, white-tailed, grey-headed and brown-chested lapwings are truly migratory species. The Andean lapwing moves downhill in winter.

Spur-winged, blacksmith, river, southern, Andean and pied lapwings are boldly patterned, red-eyed species with a spurred carpal (wrist) joint.

Many species have wattles which can be small (black-headed, spot-breasted, red-wattled and banded lapwings) or large (white-crowned, African wattled, yellow-wattled, Javan, and masked lapwings). The latter species are the largest of the plover family, since several exceed 30 cm (12 in).

== Systematics ==
The genus Vanellus was erected by the French zoologist Mathurin Jacques Brisson in 1760. The name was derived by tautonymy from the original binomial name of the northern lapwing Tringa vanellus introduced by Linnaeus in 1758. Vanellus is the Medieval Latin for a "lapwing". It is a diminutive of the Latin vanus meaning "winnowing" or "fan".

The systematics of Vanellus have hitherto resisted clear resolution. Essentially, no major revision can be brought to agree with another, and up to 19 genera were at one time recognized for the 24 lapwing species. While it might be desirable to split up this large and diverse genus a bit, the morphological characters are a confusing mix of apomorphic and plesiomorphic traits in any one species, with few relationships readily apparent. Molecular data has been found to provide even less sufficient resolution, though the lapwings have not yet been as thoroughly studied under this aspect as other Charadriiformes.

The only thing that can be said with a fair degree of certainty is that according to the DNA sequence data one group of 5 species seems to stand out. These are wattle-less lapwings which were separated as Anitibyx, Belonopterus, Hoplopterus (in the narrow sense) and Ptiloscelys. They are visually very dissimilar, but it is notable that their distribution forms a clean band through the tropical regions of the world except Australia; they might conceivably form a clade. The only species among them that is migratory is the Andean lapwing (V. resplendens), which as noted above cannot be allied with the truly migratory lapwings on these grounds. However, if these were to be split off, for one thing it is almost certain that other lineages would also require separation; the new genus' name would probably be Hoplopterus, which is the longest- and most widely used alternative lapwing genus.

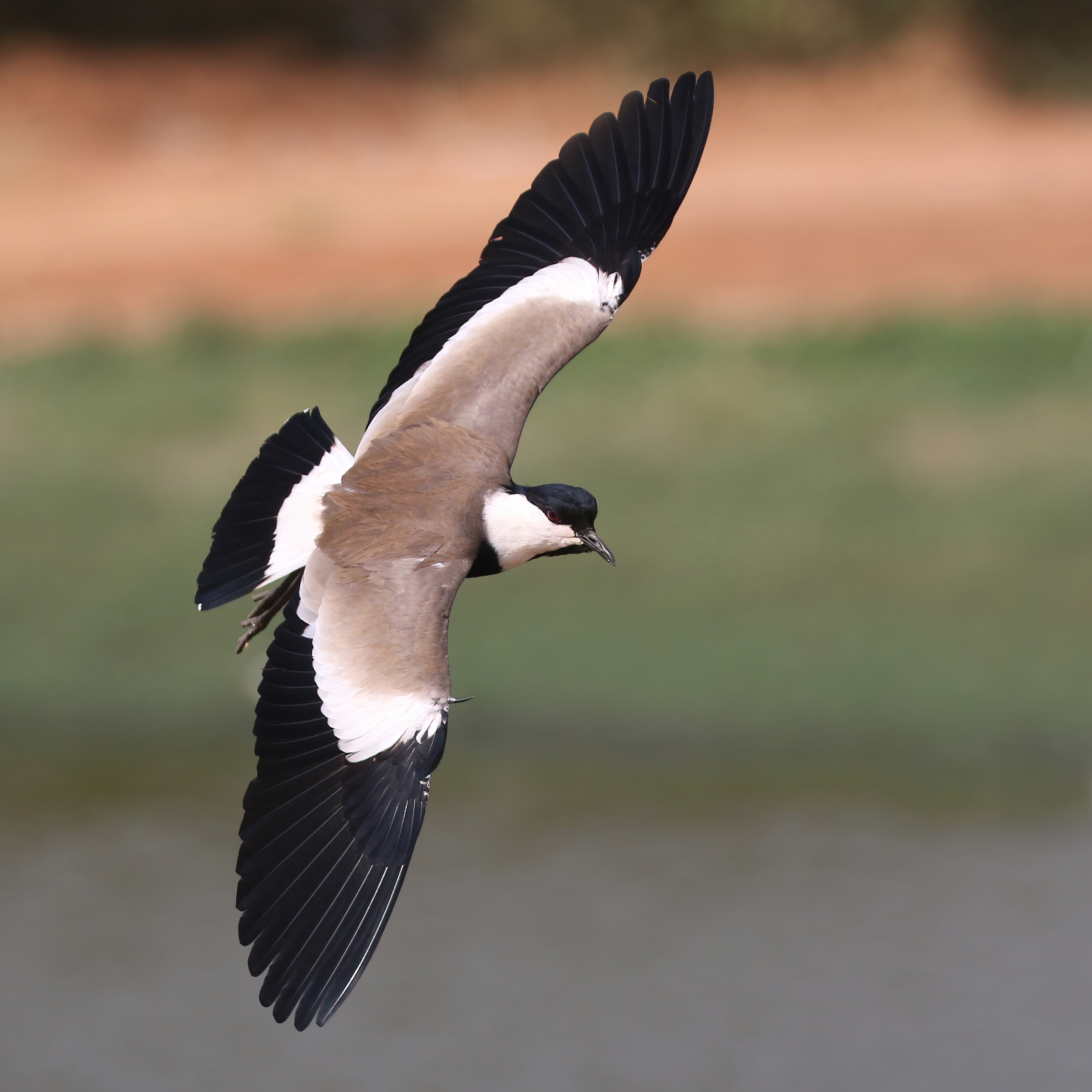
Spur-winged lapwing

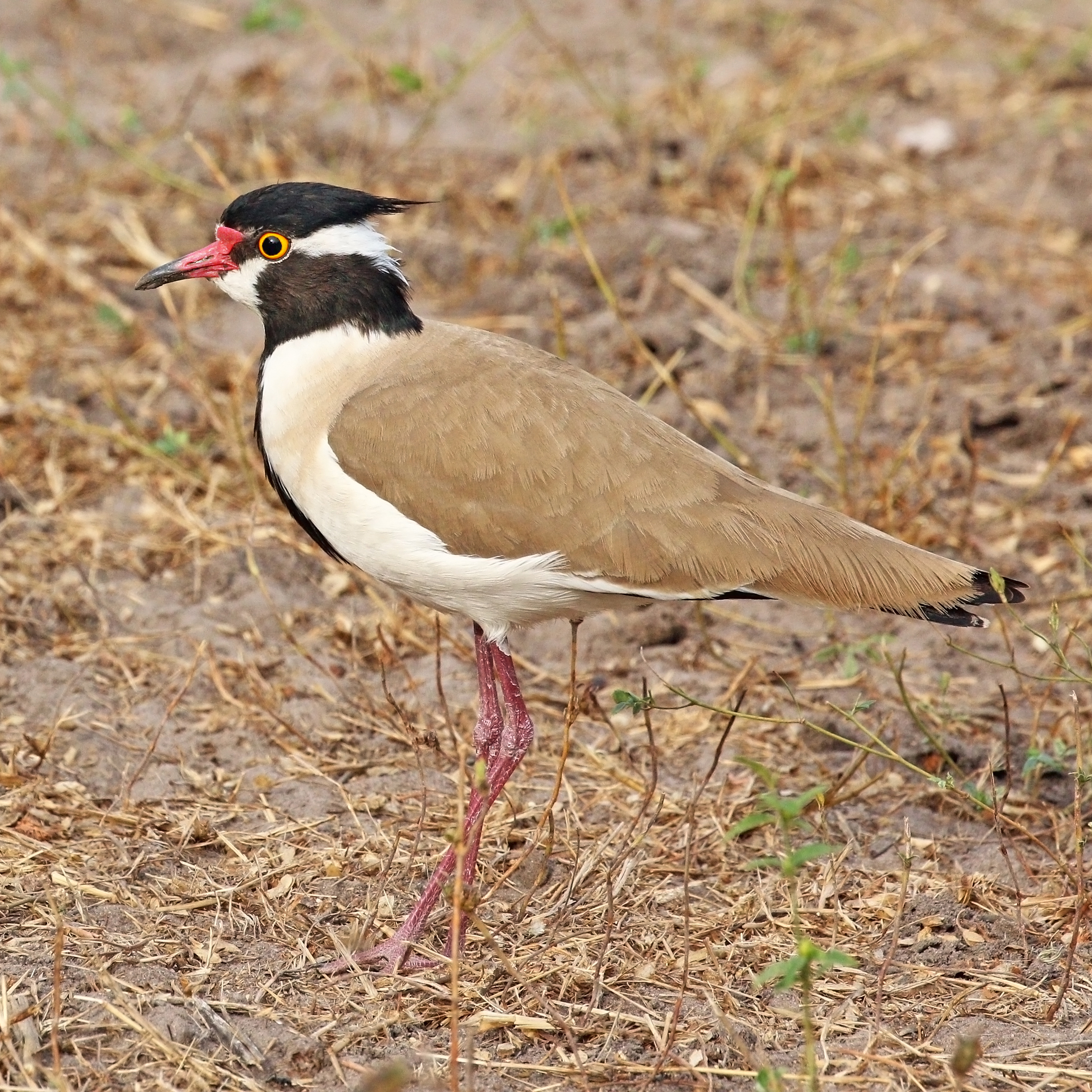
Black-headed lapwing

=== List of species in taxonomic order ===
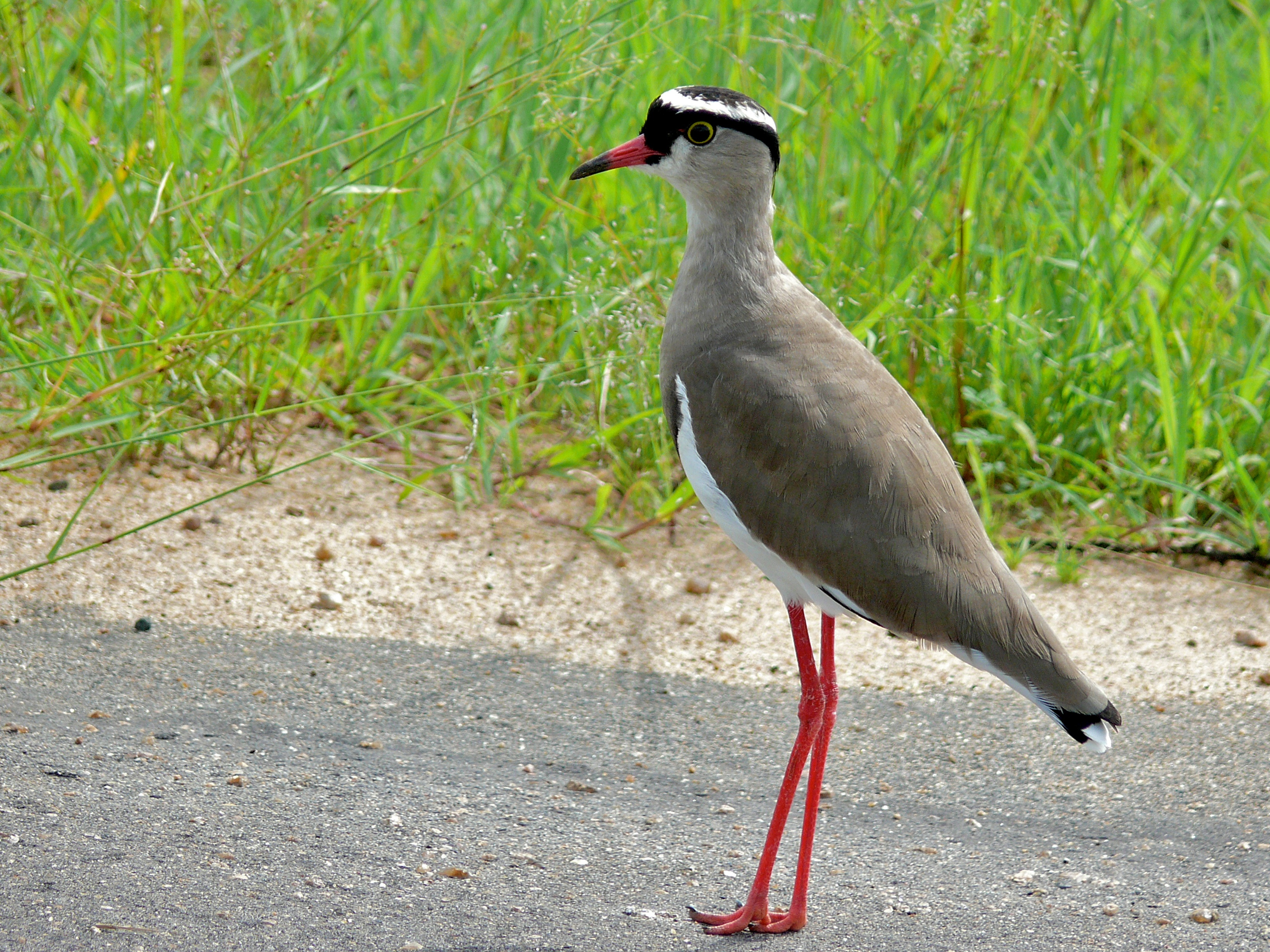
- Crowned lapwing
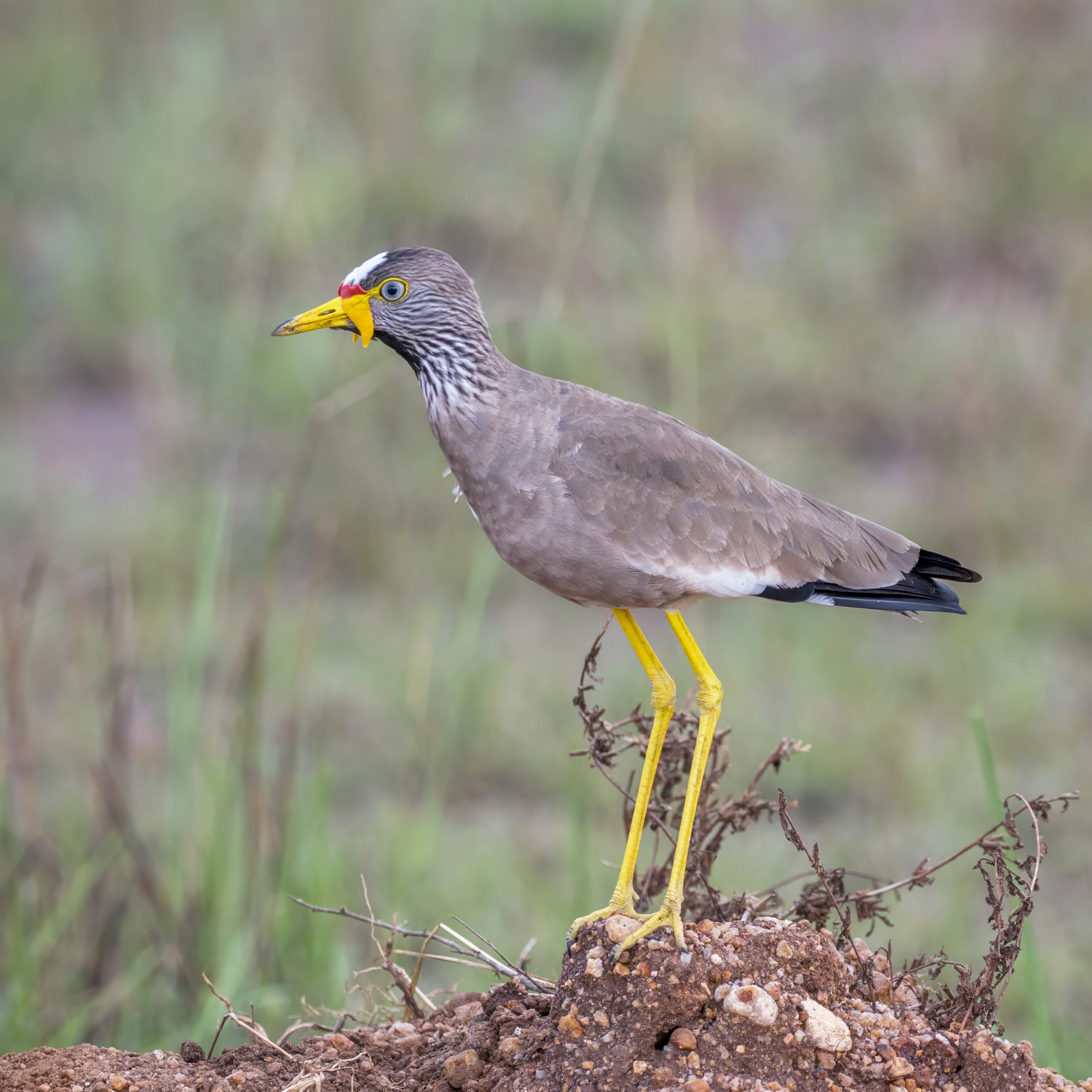
  African wattled lapwing
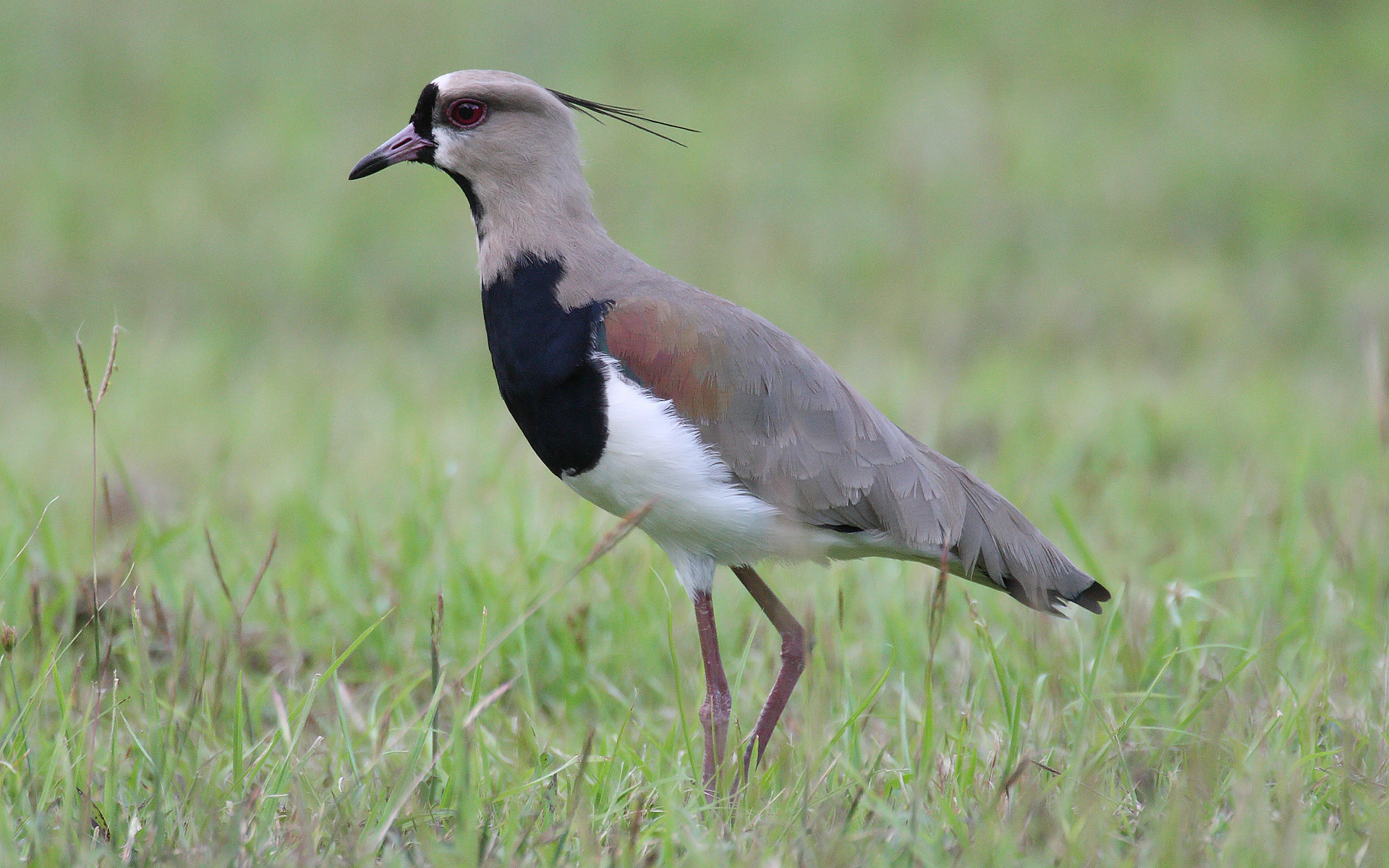
  Southern lapwing
  Northern lapwing, also known as green plover and as peewit, Vanellus vanellus

Alternatively placed in Hemiparra:

- Long-toed lapwing, Vanellus crassirostris

Alternatively placed in Anitibyx:

- Blacksmith lapwing or blacksmith plover, Vanellus armatus

Alternatively placed in Hoplopterus:

- Spur-winged lapwing or "spur-winged plover", Vanellus spinosus
- River lapwing or "spur-winged lapwing", Vanellus duvaucelii

Alternatively placed in Sarciophorus, Lobivanellus or Hoplopterus:

- Black-headed lapwing or black-headed plover, Vanellus tectus

Alternatively placed in Lobipluvia or Hoplopterus:

- Yellow-wattled lapwing, Vanellus malabaricus

Alternatively placed in Xiphidiopterus or Hoplopterus:

- White-crowned lapwing, white-headed lapwing, white-crowned plover or white-headed plover, Vanellus albiceps

Alternatively placed in Stephanibyx or Hoplopterus:

- Senegal lapwing or lesser black-winged lapwing, Vanellus lugubris
- Black-winged lapwing or greater black-winged lapwing, Vanellus melanopterus
- Crowned lapwing or crowned plover, Vanellus coronatus

Alternatively placed in Afribyx:

- African wattled lapwing or wattled lapwing, Vanellus senegallus

Alternatively placed in Tylibyx, Lobivanellus or Hoplopterus:

- Spot-breasted lapwing, Vanellus melanocephalus

Alternatively placed in Anomalophrys:

- Brown-chested lapwing, Vanellus superciliosus

Alternatively placed in Microsarcops or Hoplopterus:

- Grey-headed lapwing, Vanellus cinereus

Alternatively placed in Lobivanellus or Hoplopterus:

- Red-wattled lapwing, Vanellus indicus

Alternatively placed in Rogibyx:

- Javan lapwing, Javanese lapwing, or Javanese wattled lapwing, Vanellus macropterus

Alternatively placed in Zonifer, Lobivanellus or Hoplopterus:

- Banded lapwing, Vanellus tricolor

Alternatively placed in Lobibyx, Lobivanellus or Hoplopterus:

- Masked lapwing or "spur-winged plover", Vanellus miles

Alternatively placed in Chettusia:

- Sociable lapwing or sociable plover, Vanellus gregarius

Alternatively placed in Vanellochettusia or Chettusia:

- White-tailed lapwing or white-tailed plover, Vanellus leucurus

Alternatively placed in Belonopterus:

- Southern lapwing, Vanellus chilensis

Alternatively placed in Ptiloscelys or Belonopterus:

- Andean lapwing, Vanellus resplendens

==== Prehistoric species ====
Species known only from fossil or subfossil remains include:

- †Vanellus madagascariensis (14th century Madagascar)
- †Vanellus liffyae (Late Pliocene of central Australia)
- †Vanellus lilloi (Middle/Late Pleistocene of Centinela del Mar, Argentina)
- †Vanellus downsi (Late Pleistocene of Rancho La Brea, USA)
- †Vanellus edmundi (Late Pleistocene of Talalra, Peru)

The last three of these seem to be very closely related to the southern lapwing and all were placed in Belonopterus by the describing authors. If Viator picis, also from the Late Pleistocene of Talara, does not belong to an entirely extinct lineage, it might belong to that group too; it seems too large to be closely related to the smallish pied lapwing.

Neither the Early Oligocene Dolicopterus from Ronzon, France nor the supposed mid-Oligocene lapwing "Vanellus" selysii of Rupelmonde (Belgium) unquestionably belong here. While their age suggests that they may indeed represent some ancient lapwings, the fossil remains have not been studied for many decades and a review is seriously overdue.

== Sources ==
- Campbell, Kenneth E. Jr. (2002): A new species of Late Pleistocene lapwing from Rancho La Brea, California [English with Spanish abstract]. Condor 104: 170–174. doi:10.1650/0010-5422(2002)104[0170:ANSOLP]2.0.CO;2 HTML abstract and first page image
- Mlíkovský, Jirí (2002): Cenozoic Birds of the World, Part 1: Europe. Ninox Press, Prague. ISBN 80-901105-3-8 PDF fulltext
- Piersma, Theunis & Wiersma, Popko (1996): Family Charadriidae (Plovers). In: del Hoyo, Josep; Elliott, Andrew & Sargatal, Jordi (eds.): Handbook of Birds of the World (Volume 3: Hoatzin to Auks): 384–443, plates 35–39. Lynx Edicions, Barcelona. ISBN 84-87334-20-2
- Thomas, Gavin H.; Wills, Matthew A. & Székely, Tamás (2004). "A supertree approach to shorebird phylogeny". BMC Evolutionary Biology. 4: 28. doi:10.1186/1471-2148-4-28. PMC 515296. PMID 15329156.
