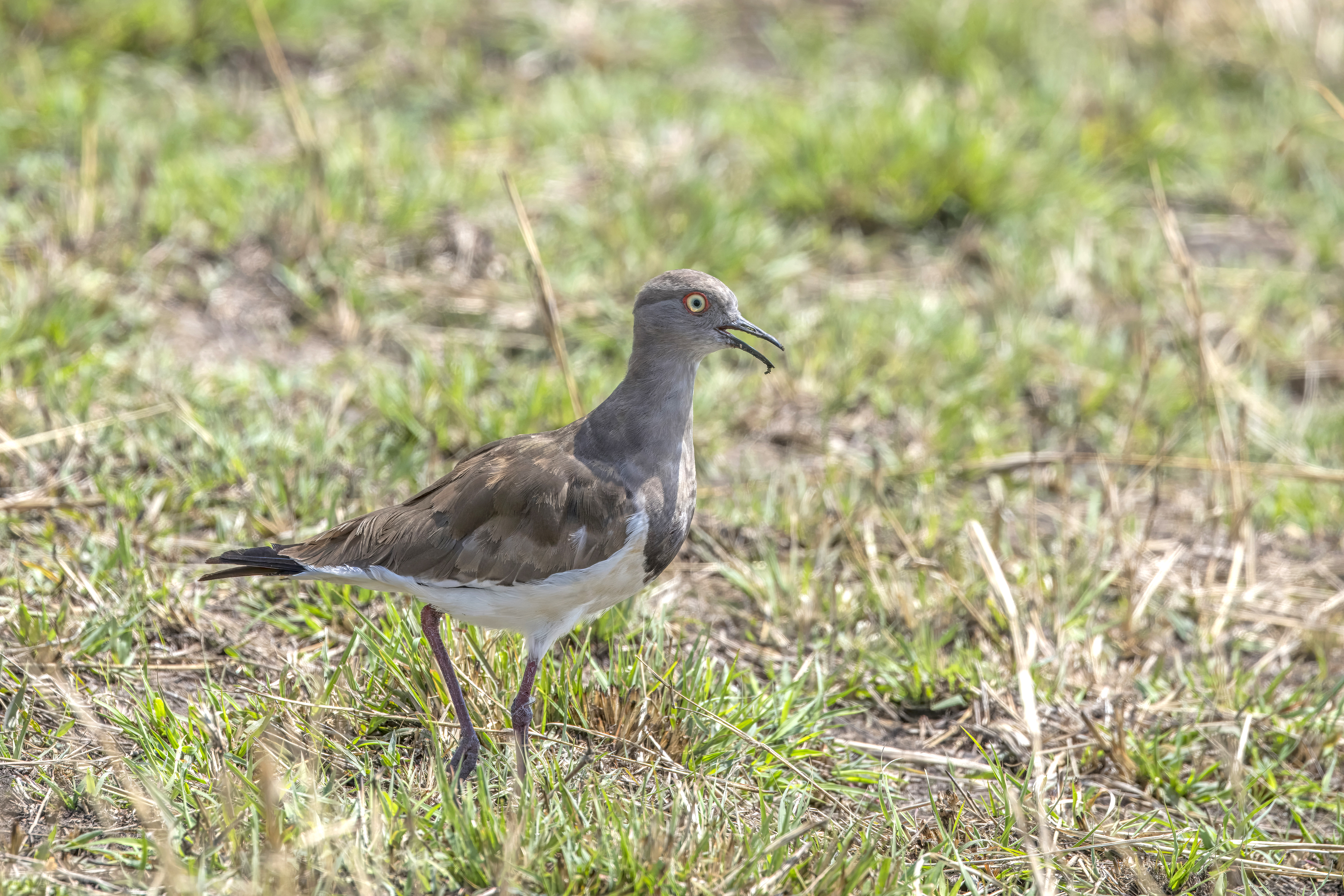
- Vanellus melanopterus minor Serengeti National Park, Tanzania

Conservation status
- Least Concern (IUCN 3.1)

Scientific classification
- Kingdom: Animalia
- Phylum: Chordata
- Class: Aves
- Order: Charadriiformes
- Family: Charadriidae
- Genus: Vanellus
- Species: V. melanopterus

Binomial name
- Vanellus melanopterus (Cretzschmar, 1829)

Synonyms
- Charadrius melanopterus Cretzschmar, 1829; Hoplopterus melanopterus (Cretzschmar, 1829); Stephanibyx melanopterus (Cretzschmar, 1829)

= Black-winged lapwing =

Species of bird

The black-winged lapwing. black-winged plover or greater black-winged lapwing (Vanellus melanopterus) is an east African species that is found from the Ethiopian highlands in the north to central Kenya (race V. m. melanopterus), and again at middle to coastal elevations in eastern South Africa (race V. m. minor). It is a habitat specialist of short grass in well-watered temperate grasslands. They may move about locally to find ideal situations, often at night. In their tightly grouped flying flocks they resemble plovers.

== Description ==
A black breast band separates the lapwing's grey head and neck from the white underside. The wing coverts are brown. It has a variable but prominent white forehead patch similar to its near relative, the Senegal lapwing, but in contrast shows a prominent white wingbar in flight, bordered by black remiges. The two species are also separated by their respective habitat preferences, the Senegal lapwing preferring lower, mostly drier locations.

== Habits and breeding ==
The black-winged lapwing behaves somewhat like the similar-sized but more generally occurring crowned lapwing and the two species sometimes occur in mixed flocks.

The leg colour brightens during the spring breeding season, when the birds sometimes move to higher elevations. Males show mutual aggression at this time and establish territories by calling and display flights which may include exaggerated wing beats. A receptive female will follow the male in flight and copulation may follow soon after. The top of a slope in burnt grassland is a favourite location for nesting.

The eggs are fairly large and dark in colour. Incubation starts when the clutch of usually 3 is complete. The adults relay one another in shifts of about 90 minutes. Insulating nest lining is added periodically to the well-lined nest until the eggs are half buried. The young hatch in just under a month and require about another month to become self-sufficient.

== Food and territories ==
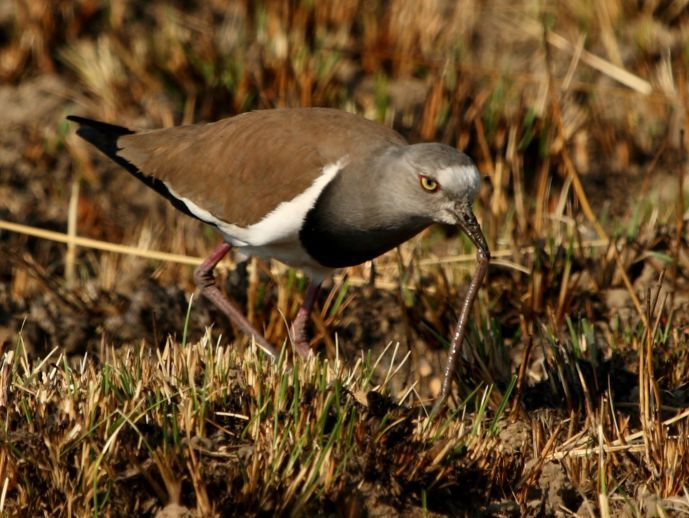
Black-winged lapwing with earthworm in Midmar Nature Reserve

Black-winged lapwings hunt termites on the ground, which constitutes a large part of their diet. They also take tenebrionid beetles and ants, and in captivity prefer earthworms and mealworms. Feeding territories of smaller than one hectare are defended by small groups of these birds. Newly found territories are most aggressively defended through vocal and visual threat displays or aerial mobbing. Large groups however form non-territorial flocks when ample habitat is found.

== Conservation status ==
Human activities impact both positively and negatively on this species; it is not endangered. The black-winged lapwing is one of the species to which the Agreement on the Conservation of African-Eurasian Migratory Waterbirds (AEWA) applies.
