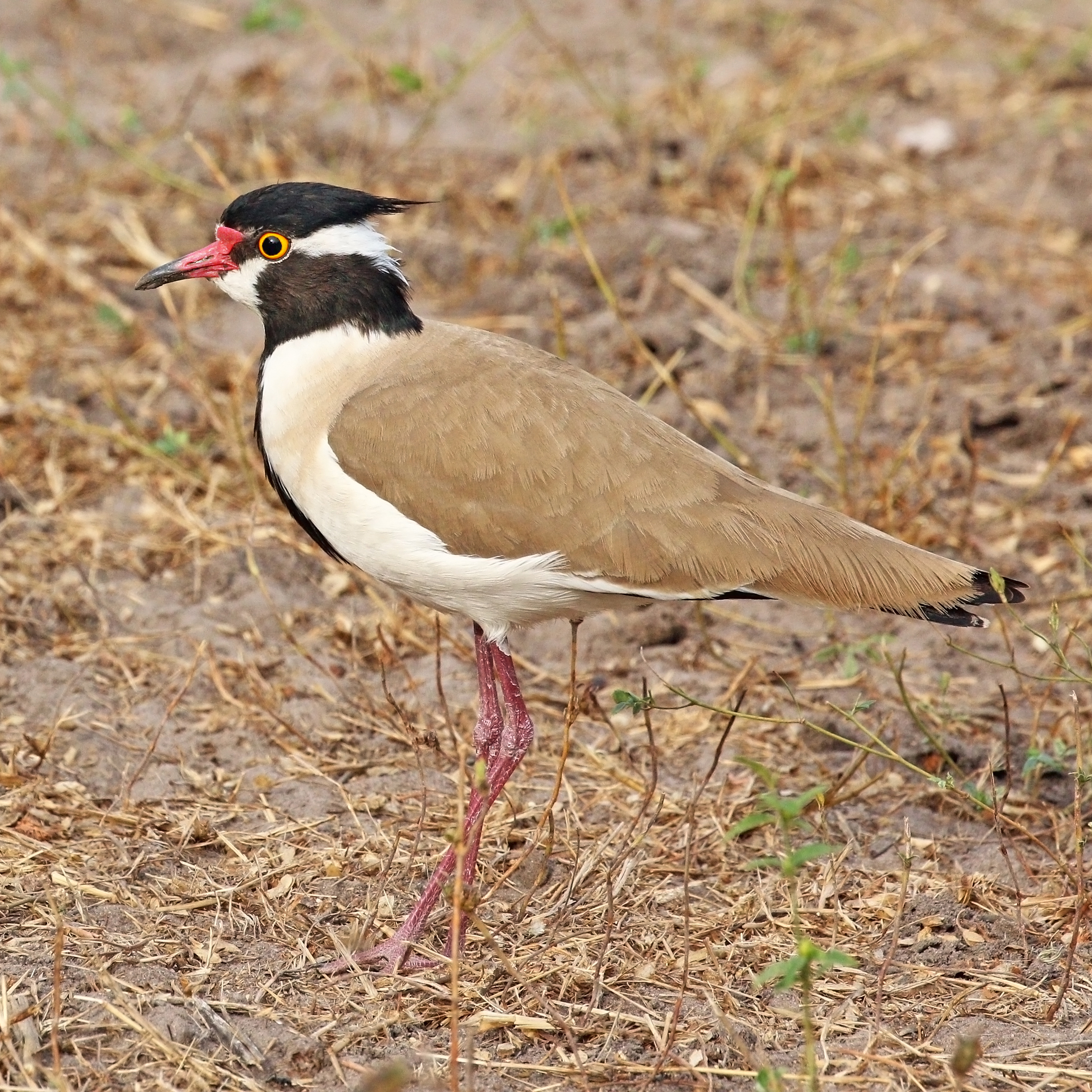
- V. t. tectus, Senegal

Conservation status
- Least Concern (IUCN 3.1)

Scientific classification
- Kingdom: Animalia
- Phylum: Chordata
- Class: Aves
- Order: Charadriiformes
- Family: Charadriidae
- Genus: Vanellus
- Species: V. tectus

Binomial name
- Vanellus tectus (Boddaert, 1783)

Synonyms
- Charadrius tectus Boddaert, 1783; Hoplopterus tectus (Boddaert, 1783); Lobivanellus tectus (Boddaert, 1783); Sarciophorus tectus (Boddaert, 1783)

= Black-headed lapwing =

Species of bird

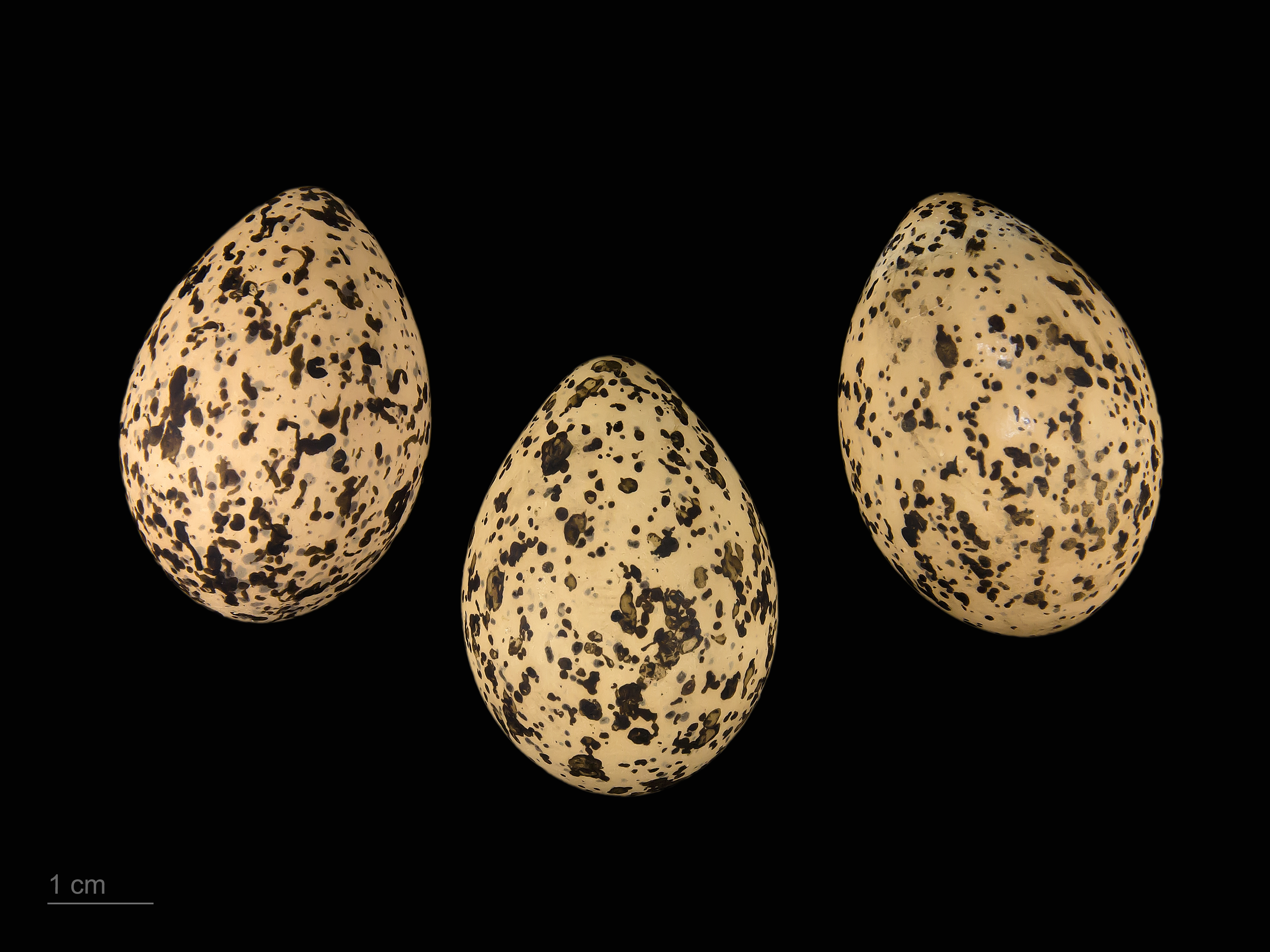
Vanellus tectus – MHNT

The black-headed lapwing or black-headed plover (Vanellus tectus) is a large lapwing, a group of largish waders in the family Charadriidae. It is a resident breeder across sub-Saharan Africa from Senegal to Ethiopia, although it has seasonal movements. It lays two or three eggs on a ground scrape.

These are conspicuous and unmistakable birds. They are medium-large waders with a black head other than a white forehead, lower face and bands across the rear head and nape. There is a wispy black crest like northern lapwing and the bill and legs are red. The tail is white, tipped black.

In flight, the black-headed lapwing's upperwings have black flight feathers and brown coverts separated by a white bar. The underwings are white with black flight feathers.

This species is a common breeder in wet lowland habitats close to water. It often feeds in drier habitats, such as golf courses and grassy scrub, picking insects and other invertebrates from the ground.

The black-headed lapwing has a metallic tink-tink call.

== Taxonomy ==
The black-headed lapwing was described by the French polymath Georges-Louis Leclerc, Comte de Buffon in 1781 in his Histoire Naturelle des Oiseaux from a specimen collected in Senegal. The bird was also illustrated in a hand-coloured plate engraved by François-Nicolas Martinet in the Planches Enluminées D'Histoire Naturelle which was produced under the supervision of Edme-Louis Daubenton to accompany Buffon's text. Neither the plate caption nor Buffon's description included a scientific name but in 1783 the Dutch naturalist Pieter Boddaert coined the binomial name Charadrius tectus in his catalogue of the Planches Enluminées. The black-headed lapwing is now placed in the genus Vanellus that was erected by the French zoologist Mathurin Jacques Brisson in 1760. The generic name Vanellus is the Medieval Latin for a "lapwing". It is a diminutive of the Latin vanus meaning "winnowing" or "fan". The specific epithet tectus is Latin for "covered" (i.e. blackcrowned).

Two subspecies are recognised:

- V. t. tectus (Boddaert, 1783) – southwest Mauritania to Ethiopia south to Ivory Coast and Uganda
- V. t. latifrons (Reichenow, 1881) – south Somalia to east Kenya
