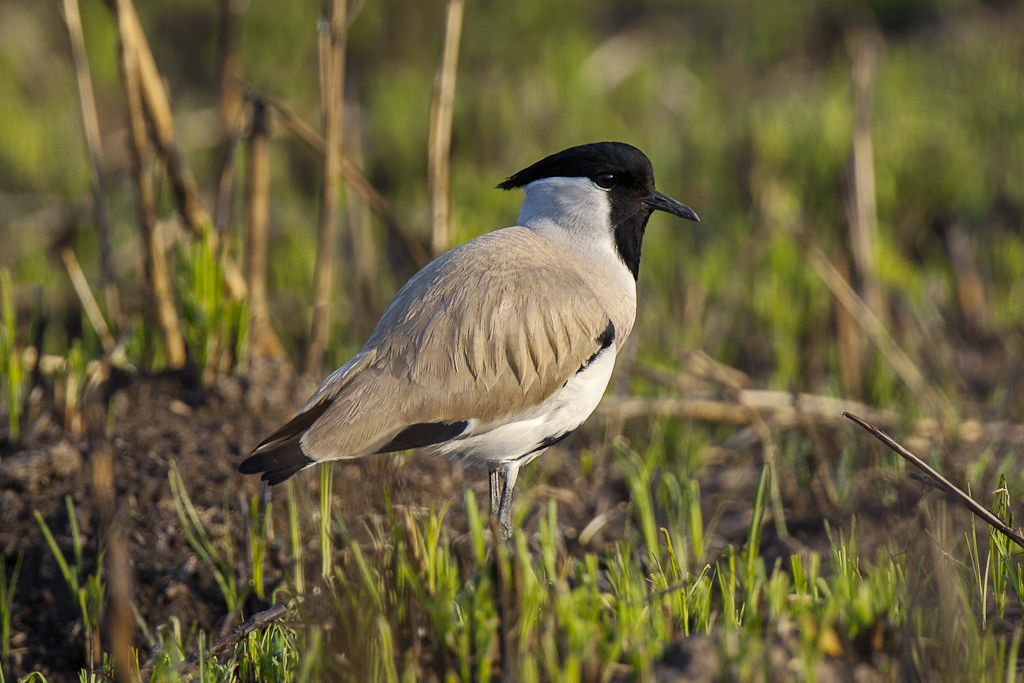

Conservation status
- Near Threatened (IUCN 3.1)

Scientific classification
- Kingdom: Animalia
- Phylum: Chordata
- Class: Aves
- Order: Charadriiformes
- Family: Charadriidae
- Genus: Vanellus
- Species: V. duvaucelii

Binomial name
- Vanellus duvaucelii (Lesson, 1826)

Synonyms
- Charadrius duvaucelii Lesson, 1826; Hoplopterus duvaucelii (Lesson, 1826)

= River lapwing =

Species of bird

The river lapwing (Vanellus duvaucelii) is a lapwing species which breeds from the Indian subcontinent eastwards to Southeast Asia. It range includes much of northern and northeastern India, and extends through Southeast Asia to Vietnam. It appears to be entirely sedentary. Formerly also called spur-winged lapwing, this name is better reserved for one of the "spur-winged plovers" of old, Vanellus spinosus of Africa, whose scientific name it literally translates. The masked lapwing of Australasia was at one time also called "spur-winged plover" (and still is in New Zealand), completing the name confusion.

This species resembles the closely related spur-winged lapwing of Africa, and has sometimes been considered conspecific. The species name commemorates Alfred Duvaucel.

== Description ==
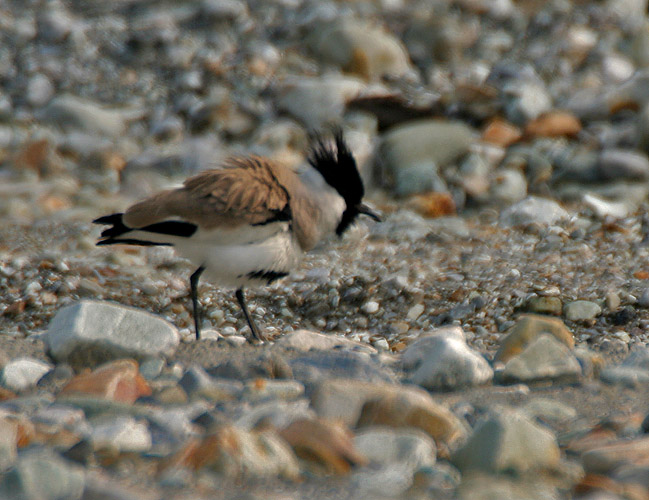
at Jayanti in Buxa Tiger Reserve in Jalpaiguri district of West Bengal, India.

The river lapwing is 29–32 cm long. It has a black crest, crown, face and central throat and grey-white neck sides and nape. It has a grey-brown breast band and white underparts with a black belly patch. The back is brown, the rump is white and the tail is black. This is a striking species in flight, with black primaries, white under wings and upper wing secondaries, and brown upper wing coverts.

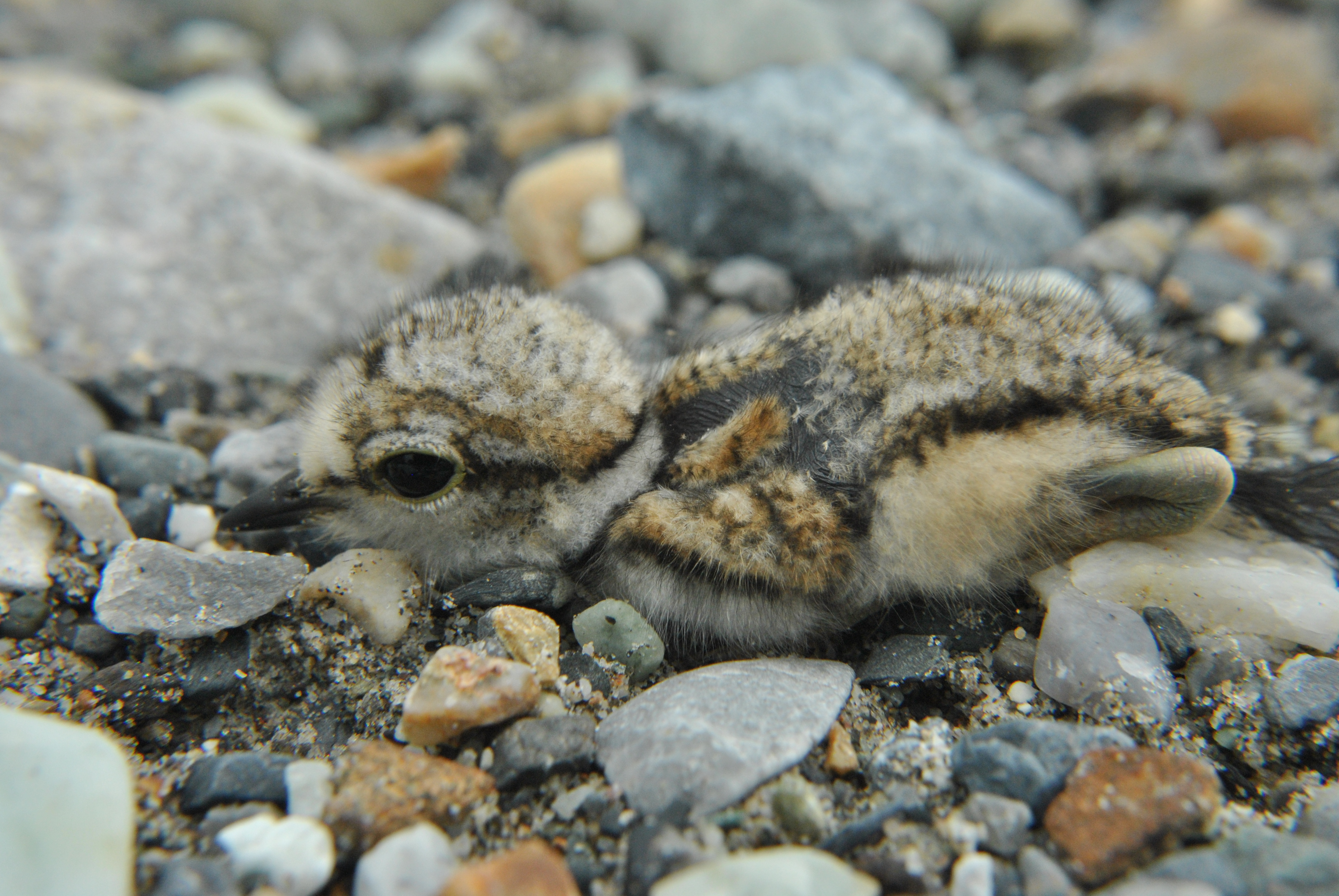
River lapwing chick found in Jayanti river bed, Buxa Tiger Reserve, West Bengal, India

Adults of both sexes are similarly plumaged, but males are slightly larger than females. Young birds have the brown tips to the black head feathers, a sandier brown back, and pale fringes to the upperpart and wing covert feathers. The call of the river lapwing is a sharp tip-tip or did-did-did.

== Behaviour ==
The breeding display, given on the ground, includes stooping, spinning, stretching and crest-raising.

The river lapwing nests on shingle and sand banks from March to June. It lays two eggs on a ground scrape. It feeds on insects, worms, crustaceans and molluscs in nearby wet grassland and farmland. It is not gregarious.
