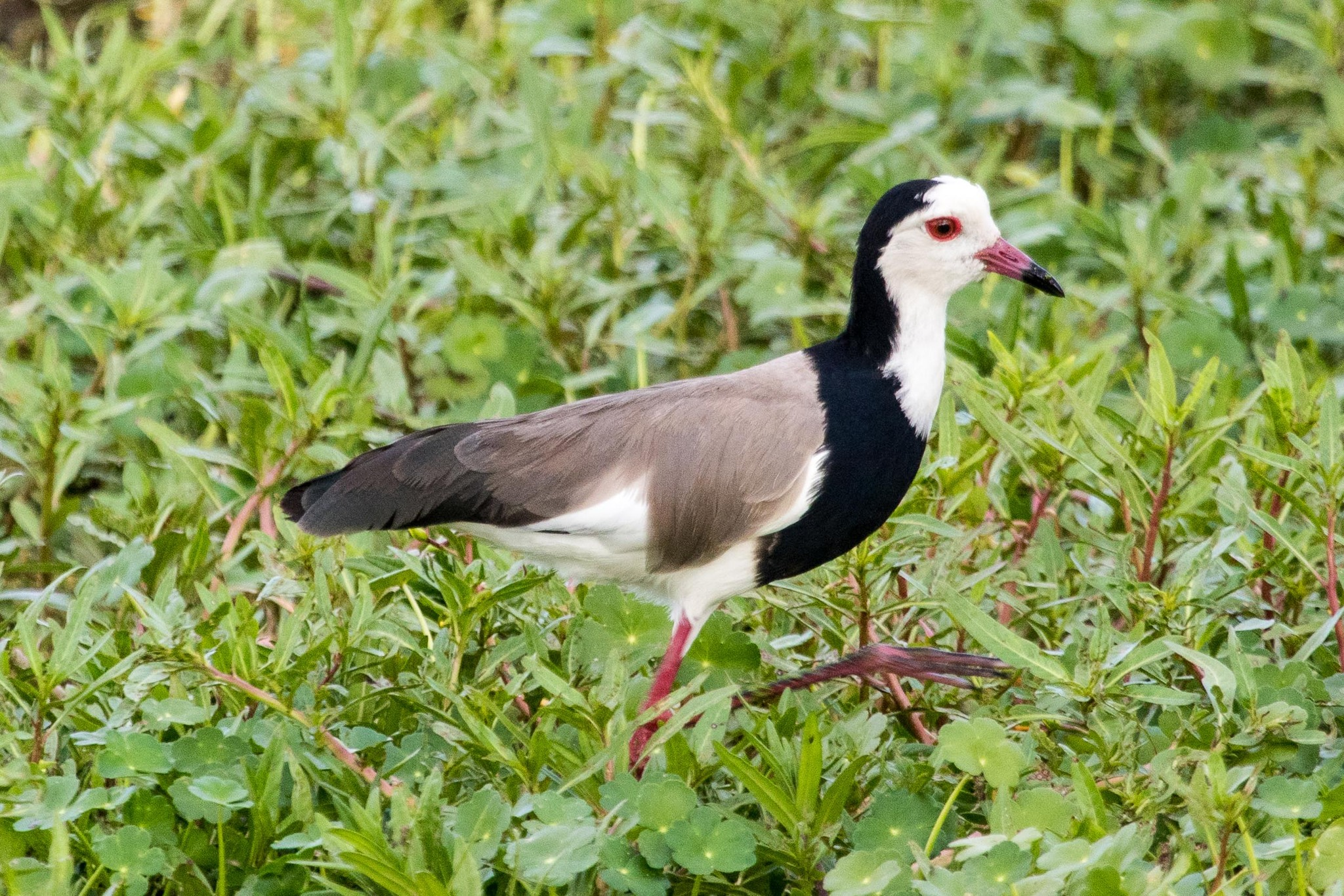

Conservation status
- Least Concern (IUCN 3.1)

Scientific classification
- Kingdom: Animalia
- Phylum: Chordata
- Class: Aves
- Order: Charadriiformes
- Family: Charadriidae
- Genus: Vanellus
- Species: V. crassirostris

Binomial name
- Vanellus crassirostris (Hartlaub, 1855)

Synonyms
- Chetusia crassirostris Hartlaub, 1855 Hemiparra crassirostris (Hartlaub, 1855)

= Long-toed lapwing =

Species of bird

The long-toed lapwing (Vanellus crassirostris), also known as the long-toed plover, is a species of wading bird in the lapwing subfamily, within the family Charadriidae. It is mainly sedentary and found across central and eastern Africa, from Chad and South Sudan in the north to Mozambique in the southeast of its range. It is one of 13 species of ground-nesting lapwings found in Africa.

== Taxonomy ==
The long-toed lapwing was formally described by Gustav Hartlaub in 1855 under the binomial name Chettusia crassirostris in the Journal für Ornithologie. The species is now one of 24 placed with the other lapwings in the genus Vanellus which was described in 1760 by Mathurin Jacques Brisson, a French zoologist. Vanellus comes from the Medieval Latin 'vannus', meaning winnowing fan, a reference to the sound of the wings of lapwings in flight. The species name crassirostris means thick-billed.

The long-toed lapwing was formerly placed within the monospecific genus Hemiparra, but now resides in the genus Vanellus with other lapwings. Vanellus is one of 10 genera of the family Charadriidae, which aside from the lapwings also contains plovers and dotterels. Members of Charadriidae generally hunt invertebrates by sight with a run-and-pause technique and most have a socially monogamous mating system.

=== Subspecies ===
Two subspecies are recognized: nominate V. c. crassirostris is found mainly from South Sudan to Uganda, and V. c. leucopterus is distributed from Tanzania to northeast South Africa, as well as western Angola. Their ranges meet in Tanzania, southeast D.R. Congo, and northern Malawi, where there is an intergrade zone, in which both subspecies mate with each other. Intergrades were formerly treated as a separate subspecies V. c. hybrida.

The two subspecies have slight differences in plumage and morphology. The nominate V. c. crassirostris has black flight feathers; in V. c. leucopterus, only the outer primary feathers are black while the inner primary and secondary flight feathers are white. V. c. leucopterus has a shorter wing length yet a longer tarsus than V. c. crassirostris, although the differences in length are only on the order of millimetres.

== Description ==
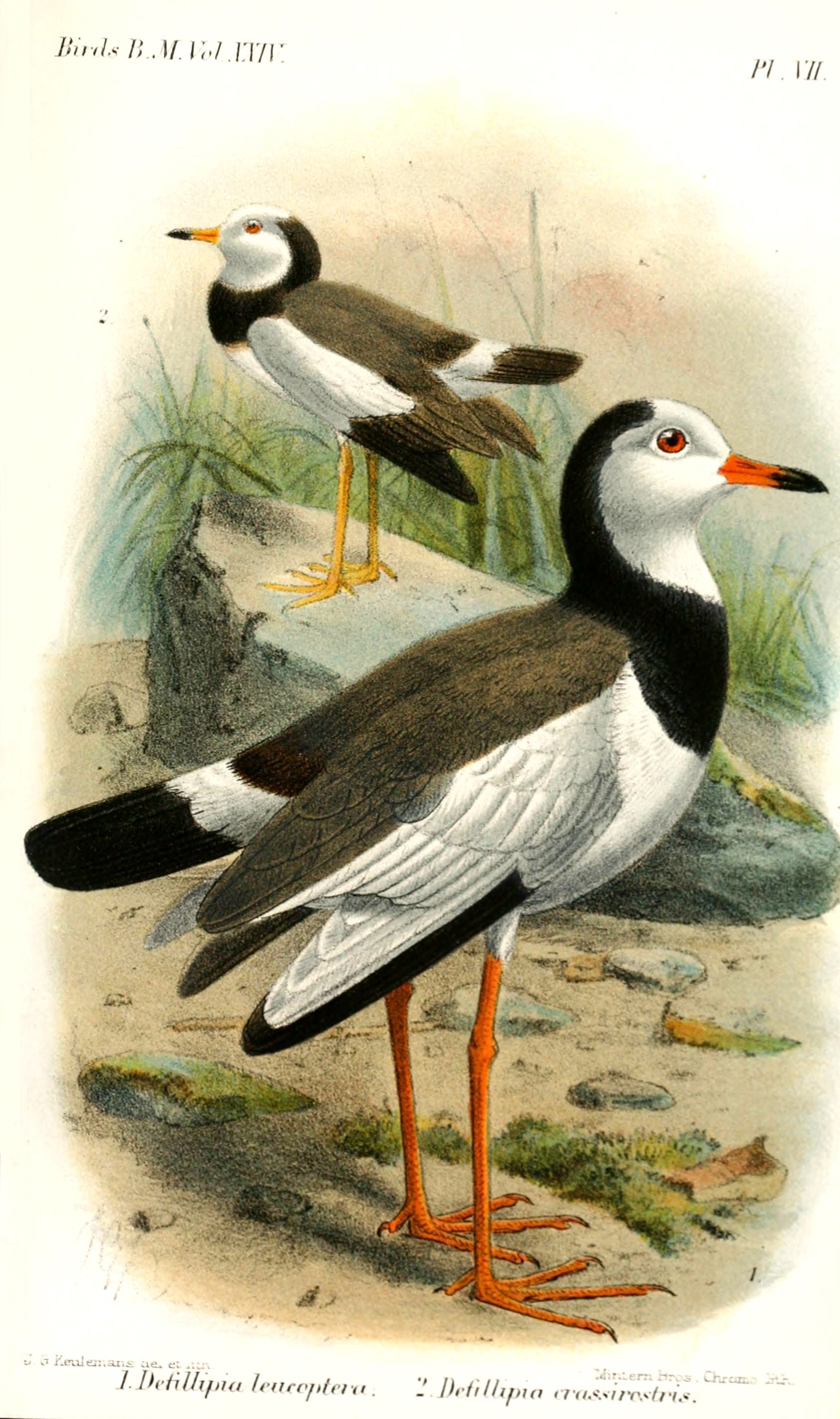
Illustration by J. G. Keulemans of subspecies V. c. leucopterus (below) with white inner primary feathers and subspecies V. c. crassirostris (above) with only black primary feathers

The long-toed lapwing measures 31 cm (12 in) in length with a body mass of 162–225 g (5.7–7.9 oz). It is a brown, black, and white lapwing with long red legs, long toes, and a red bill with a black tip. It has short wing spurs and rounded wings; in flight it shows extensive white in the wing feathers, as well as legs and feet extending beyond the end of the tail. It is sexually monomorphic and has no seasonal variation in plumage. Juveniles have a browner breast than adults and buff tips to feathers. Juvenile primary feathers are retained after the post-juvenile moult.

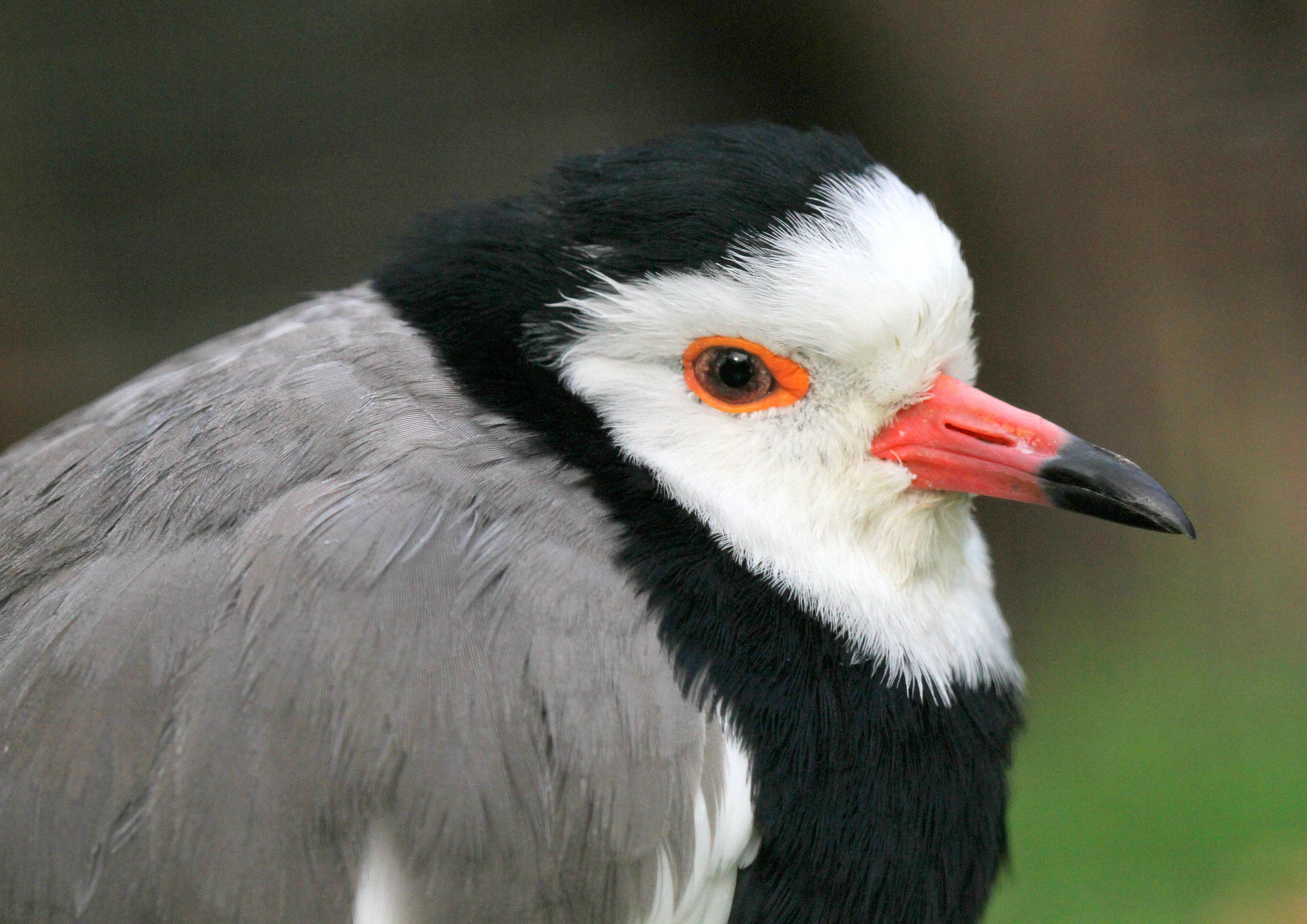
Distinctive black and white head plumage of a long-toed lapwing

=== Similar species ===
White-crowned lapwing is the only other lapwing with extensive white plumage in the wings, showing white on the primary and secondary flight feathers, but this pattern is distinct from long-toed lapwing which has black colouration on the primary flight feathers (and for V. c. crassirostris, black on the secondary feathers as well).

== Distribution and habitat ==
The long-toed lapwing is found across central and eastern Africa, from South Sudan in the north to Botswana, Mozambique, and northeast South Africa in the south of its range, as well as outlying populations in Chad and western Angola. The long-toed lapwing prefers habitats of lakes, pools, marshes, floodplains, and swamps. It finds its food of aquatic invertebrates on floating vegetation. It uses pool edges in the dry season, and in the wet season can often be found in flooded rice fields and wet grasslands. Birds are sedentary as long as water remains. Nesting and foraging areas are generally the same. It has been recorded up to an elevation of 1,300 m (4,300 ft) in Zambia. The long-toed lapwing has similar habitat preferences to the African Jacana, both using floating weeds and fringing vegetation around water. This direct association often leads lapwings to show aggressive behaviour towards jacanas, primarily as swooping attacks towards a jacana without making direct contact; one study found jacanas were attacked by adult lapwings once every 12 minutes.

== Behaviour ==
=== Diet and foraging ===
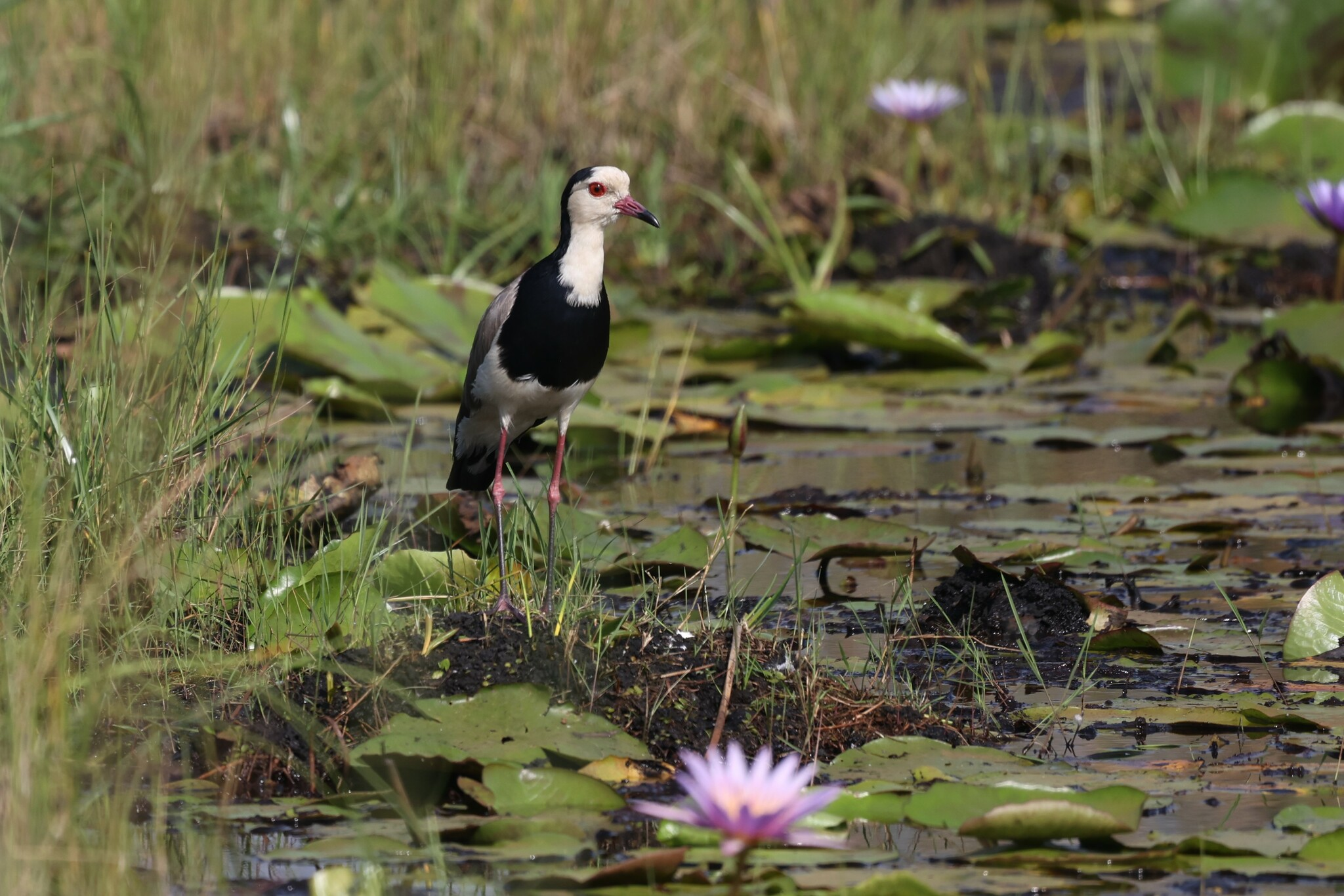
Long-toed lapwing in typical foraging habitat of aquatic vegetation

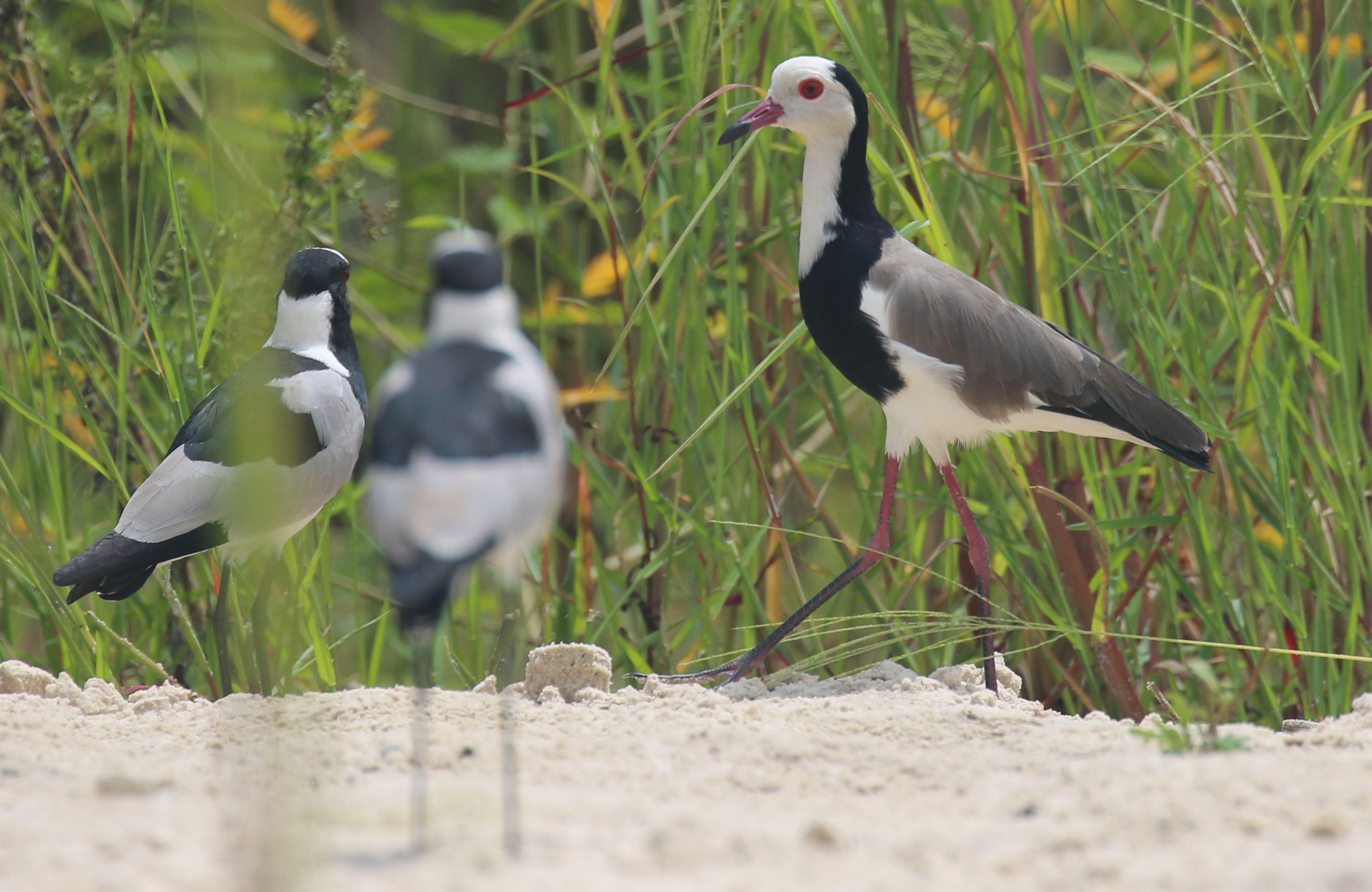
Long-toed lapwing (right) with two blacksmith lapwings (left) which both share similar habitat

The long-toed lapwing is unusual among lapwings as it feeds with behaviour like jacanas, foraging for aquatic insects, larvae, beetles, ants, dragonfly nymphs, and snails on the surface of floating aquatic vegetation, spreading out its weight through the support of its long toes. There has been documentation of some individuals using one foot to stir water, likely to bring prey to the water's surface, similar to the behaviour of blacksmith lapwing and spur-winged lapwing. It regularly forages alone; however, in the dry season birds may gather in family groups or larger groups of 10 to 20, with one record of a group of approximately 80 reported from Malawi. Foraging lapwings may follow spur-winged geese as the geese uproot dead vegetation and disturb aquatic invertebrates. Long-toed lapwings also attack non-predator bird species in their territories, such as African jacana, blacksmith lapwing, and squacco heron, all with which the lapwings share foraging habitat.

=== Reproduction ===
Long-toed lapwings are monogamous breeders that aggressively defend small territories (mean territory area is 2,900 m^{2} (0.29 ha) in Kenya) from neighbouring lapwings. Both sexes participate in the incubation of eggs in the nest, territory defence, and parental care of young. Chicks are fiercely defended by the parents from avian predators including African fish-eagles, harriers, and coucals. Persistent alarm calls and swooping attacks are employed as intense anti-predator responses, as well as escape flights during which birds fly and hover over water. Long-toed lapwings respond to predators such as harriers but can identify other raptors which are not predators, such as vultures, and do not respond to them.

The nest can be made of plant material or mud, located on the ground near the edge of water or on floating vegetation. When placed near the water's edge, the nest is a shallow scrape made of mud or plants. On floating vegetation, above water up to 1m deep, the nest is shaped like a cup and made from plants. Long-toed lapwings in swampy areas have also been known to use a platform of mosses and weeds.

Female long-toed lapwings lay 1–4 brown or olive-coloured eggs with dark markings and incubate them for 27–30 days. Chicks are precocial, leaving the nest only a few hours after hatching, and fledge approximately two months after hatching. Young regularly stay with parents a further 1–2 months after fledging. Parental behaviour, such as vigilance and tending young, reduces the foraging time of adults during the breeding season.

Breeding happens all year throughout the long-toed lapwing's range. In central Africa, egg laying occurs from December to March, while in eastern Africa from Uganda to northeast South Africa laying ranges from June to November.

=== Vocalizations ===
Calls consist of repeated clicking with a metallic tone, described as "kick-k-k-k", and a high-pitched "wheet" call when flushed. Long-toed lapwings are more vocal during the breeding season, and they call rapidly as they attack other birds in their territories.

== Predators and parasites ==
Harriers, coucals, and African fish-eagles are avian predators of long-toed lapwings.

Quill mites are obligatory ectoparasites which live and reproduce within the hollow quills of feathers, and a species associated with lapwings has been collected from long-toed lapwings in Tanzania. Quill mites feed on fluids of birds by piercing the skin from inside the feather quill, and usually live on a specific host species or genus of birds.

== Conservation status ==
The long-toed lapwing is classified as Least Concern on the IUCN Red List and is not globally threatened. Few population estimates have been made, however, except for the southern African population estimated between 25,000-50,000 individual birds. Human encroachment on aquatic areas, including with livestock, poses a threat to the habitat of long-toed lapwings.
