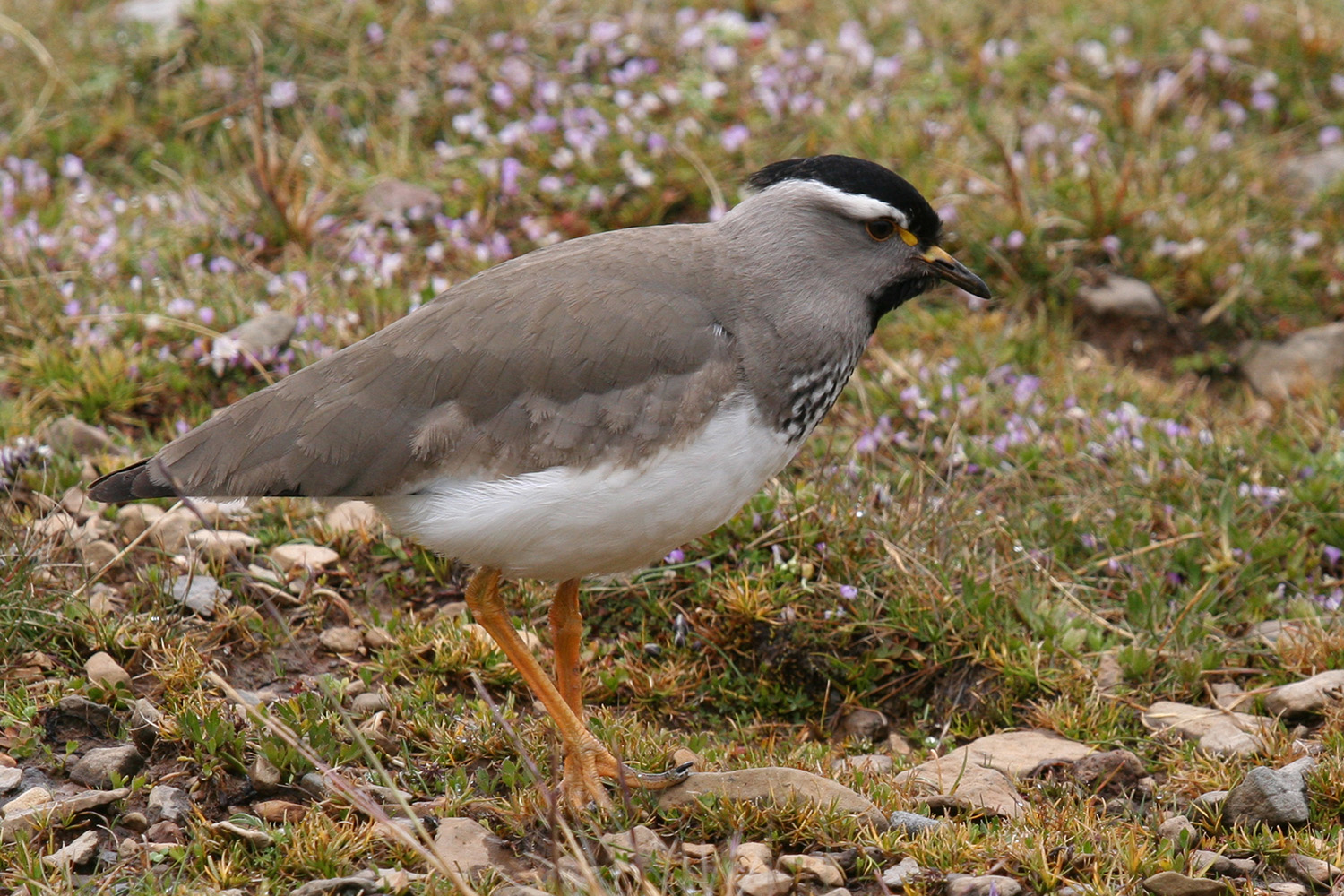

Conservation status
- Least Concern (IUCN 3.1)

Scientific classification
- Kingdom: Animalia
- Phylum: Chordata
- Class: Aves
- Order: Charadriiformes
- Family: Charadriidae
- Genus: Vanellus
- Species: V. melanocephalus

Binomial name
- Vanellus melanocephalus (Rüppell, 1845)

Synonyms
- Hoplopterus melanocephalus (Rüppell, 1845); Lobivanellus melanocephalus Rüppell, 1845; Tylibyx melanocephalus (Rüppell, 1845)

= Spot-breasted lapwing =

Species of bird

The spot-breasted lapwing (Vanellus melanocephalus), also known as the spot-breasted plover, is a species of bird in the family Charadriidae. It is endemic to the Ethiopian Highlands. There are no known subspecies of the bird.

The bird is a chunky lapwing of the Ethiopian highlands. It has a black cap, white eyebrow, black throat, and coarse spots across the breast. Found in both wet and dry montane habitats, including grassland, moorland, and marsh. It is a non-migratory bird that occurs over 247,000 square kilometers.

The spot-breasted lapwing is not migratory, but does move locally north during the rainy season. The species largely occurs in grasses, marshes, and meadows. Very little information is known about its nesting habits.

Due to climate change, and the acute vulnerability caused by being a confined endemic species, habitat loss is expected to be 86.6 percent or more by 2070.
