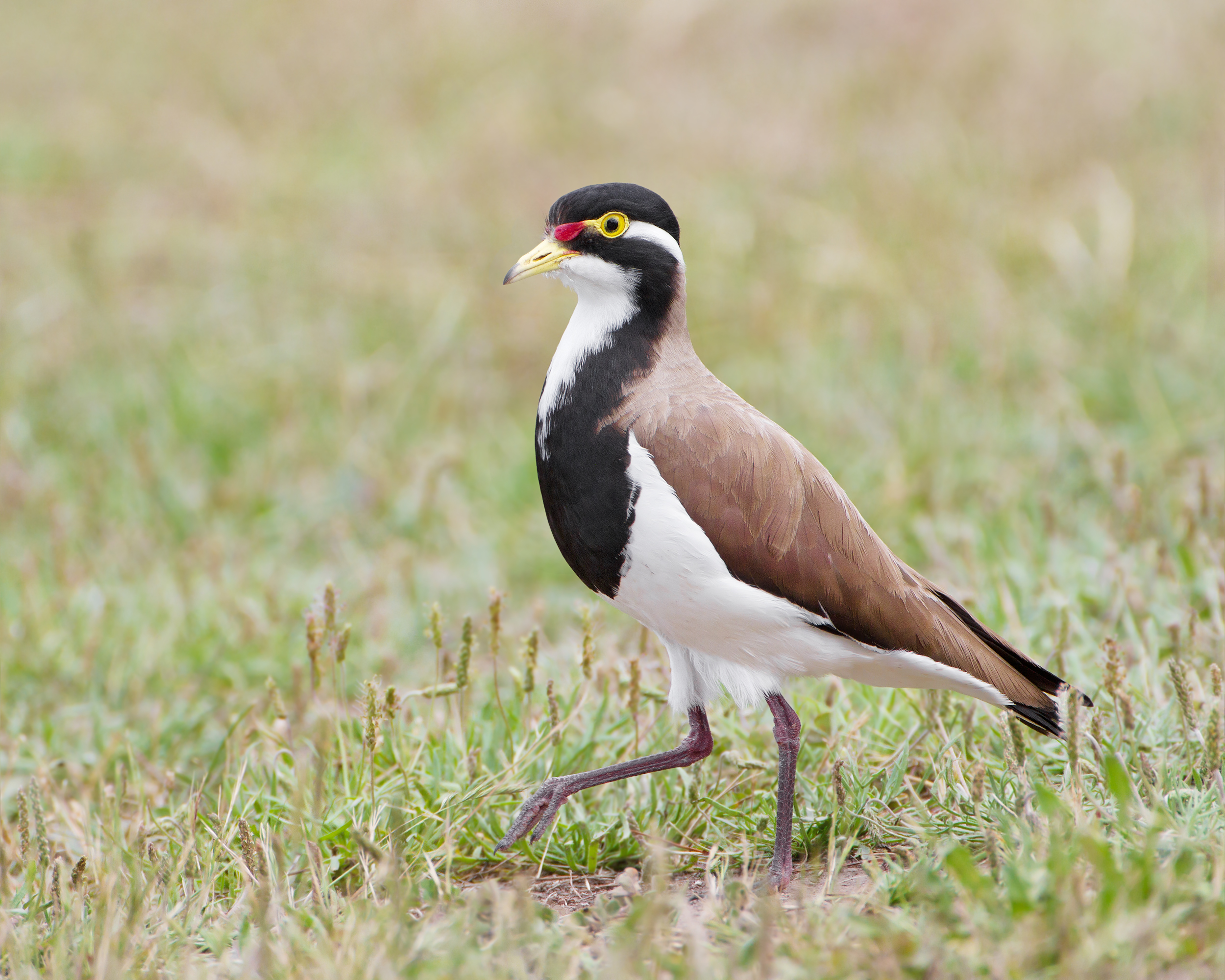

Conservation status
- Least Concern (IUCN 3.1)

Scientific classification
- Kingdom: Animalia
- Phylum: Chordata
- Class: Aves
- Order: Charadriiformes
- Family: Charadriidae
- Genus: Vanellus
- Species: V. tricolor

Binomial name
- Vanellus tricolor (Vieillot, 1818)
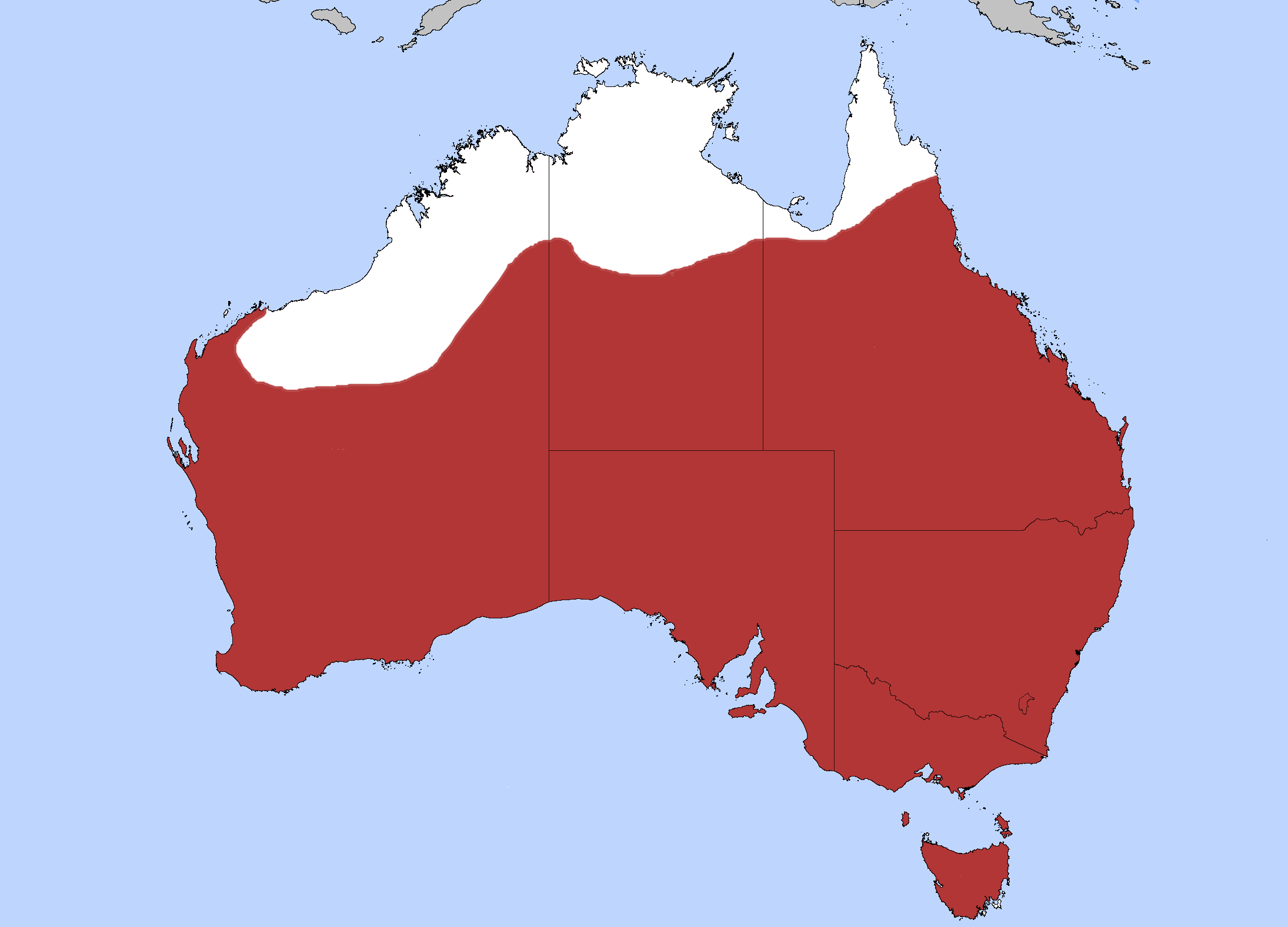
- Distribution of the banded lapwing

Synonyms
- Charadrius tricolor Vieillot, 1818; Hoplopterus tricolor (Vieillot, 1818); Lobivanellus tricolor (Vieillot, 1818)

= Banded lapwing =

Species of bird

The banded lapwing (Vanellus tricolor) is a small to medium-sized shorebird, found in small parties or large flocks on bare ground in open grasslands, agricultural land and open savannah. It is native to Australia and in the past considered as a game bird for hunting. Population estimate is 25 000 - 1 000 000. Other names include banded, black-breasted, brown flock and plain plover.

== Taxonomy ==
Lapwings belong to the family Charadriidae (plovers) and sub-family Vanellinae. Biochemical evidence suggests that plovers are holophyletic, meaning that all modern plovers, and no other taxa, share the same common ancestor. It has been suggested that most plovers originated from the Southern Hemisphere and evolved under arid and semi-arid conditions.

There are 25 extant species of lapwings. Africa has the most species of lapwings, while North America has none. Australia has two native species, the masked lapwing and the banded lapwing. The masked lapwing is split into Vanellus miles miles and Vanellus miles novaehollandiae. The first fossils of the Vanellus species were from Belgian deposits retrieved from the middle Oligocene dating back 30 million years ago, the time when the first grasses appeared.

== Description ==
The banded lapwing is a medium-sized shorebird with short dark purplish legs and a dull red tibia. They range from 25 cm to 29 cm in length and weigh on average 190 grams. They have an upright stance and a slow walk, breaking into a faster trot when alarmed. The bill is a pale yellow with a black tip and a small red wattle lies at the base. The red wattle and wing spurs are more prominent in males than females. Banded lapwings are characterised by a black cap, a white throat and underparts, white eye stripes and a black breast band extending up each side of its neck to its face. The irises are bright yellow. They fly quick, clipped wing beats, giving them the name 'lapwing'. The young range from 22 cm to 25.5 cm in length and weigh between 124 and 133 grams. Juvenile plumage is similar to that of the adults, however the crown, nape, sides of neck and breast is mottled dark brown and the feathers of the upper parts are tan.

== Distribution and habitat ==
Banded lapwings are endemic to Australia and found throughout the mainland and Tasmania. They are rarely found in northern Australia and are uncommon in most coastal areas and they are not dependent on wetlands and may live far away from water. Banded lapwings prefer open plains and short grassland areas such as heavily grazed paddocks, agricultural lands and recently germinated cereal crops most commonly found inland and pastures of coastal and inland regions. It avoids Acacia scrub areas, except where these have become more open due to overgrazing. The species has probably benefited from the clearing of forest and woodlands in southern Australia for agriculture. Outside the breeding season, banded lapwings gather in small flocks and are nomadic. Its movements from one area to another are influenced by seasonal conditions. Records from the Atlas of Victorian Birds state the banded lapwing is most frequently reported in Victoria during spring and winter, suggesting that in Victoria they breed when rainfall is highest.

== Feeding ==
All plovers are obligate feeders and routinely forage during the day and at night. They prefer areas with very short grass to feed on seeds, insects including worms, ants, termites, beetles, cockroaches, grasshoppers, crickets and caterpillars.

== Breeding ==
The movement of the banded lapwing whilst breeding is almost exclusively inland and away from wetlands banded lapwings are monogamous and breeds usually once a year throughout its normal distribution range. The breeding season is from June to November however, they may nest any month in dry inland areas following rain. It will usually nest in an open area well away from trees or scrub where the sitting bird has a wide uninterrupted view of its surroundings. Nests are a scrape or depression on the ground usually lined up with vegetation and sometimes small stones, twigs or animal droppings. The incubation period is 26 to 28 days and the care for the young is biparental. The eggs and chicks are well camouflaged. Eggs are usually in a clutch size of three to four eggs, light brown with brown and blackish-brown splotches all over the shell. Eggs are approximately 42 mm x 32 mm and pear shaped. During breeding season they are aggressive defending their territory and attacking any predator that comes close to the nests. The wing spurs are used in combat. Chicks will freeze up and remain quite still at sign of danger. Parents will distract intruders often by distraction displays and aggression. They lure the intruder away or protesting loudly, making loud swoops at the observer. They have a loud strident 'kew-kew-kew' call when alarmed or a descending 'er-chill-char, er-chill char' sound. The young can fly between three and four weeks. Reasons for nesting failure include trampling by stock, destruction of nests by vehicles and excessive human disturbance.

== Conservation ==
Conservation of banded lapwings will be dependent on appropriate management of farm and pastoral lands as it exploits a variety of open habitats and agricultural land. However, there are no immediate or serious threats to its future survival.

== Gallery ==
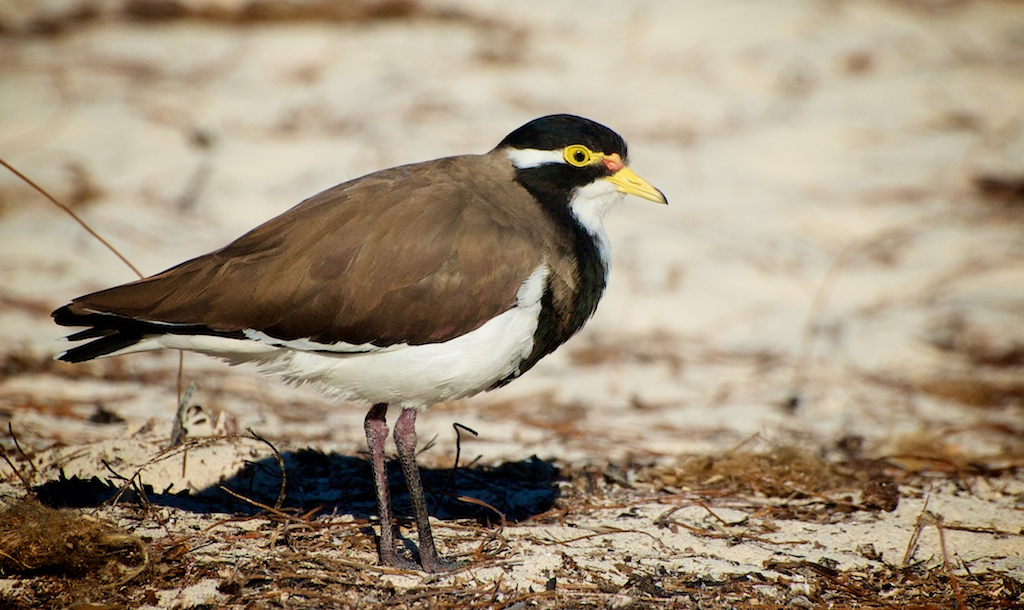
Adult on Rottnest Island

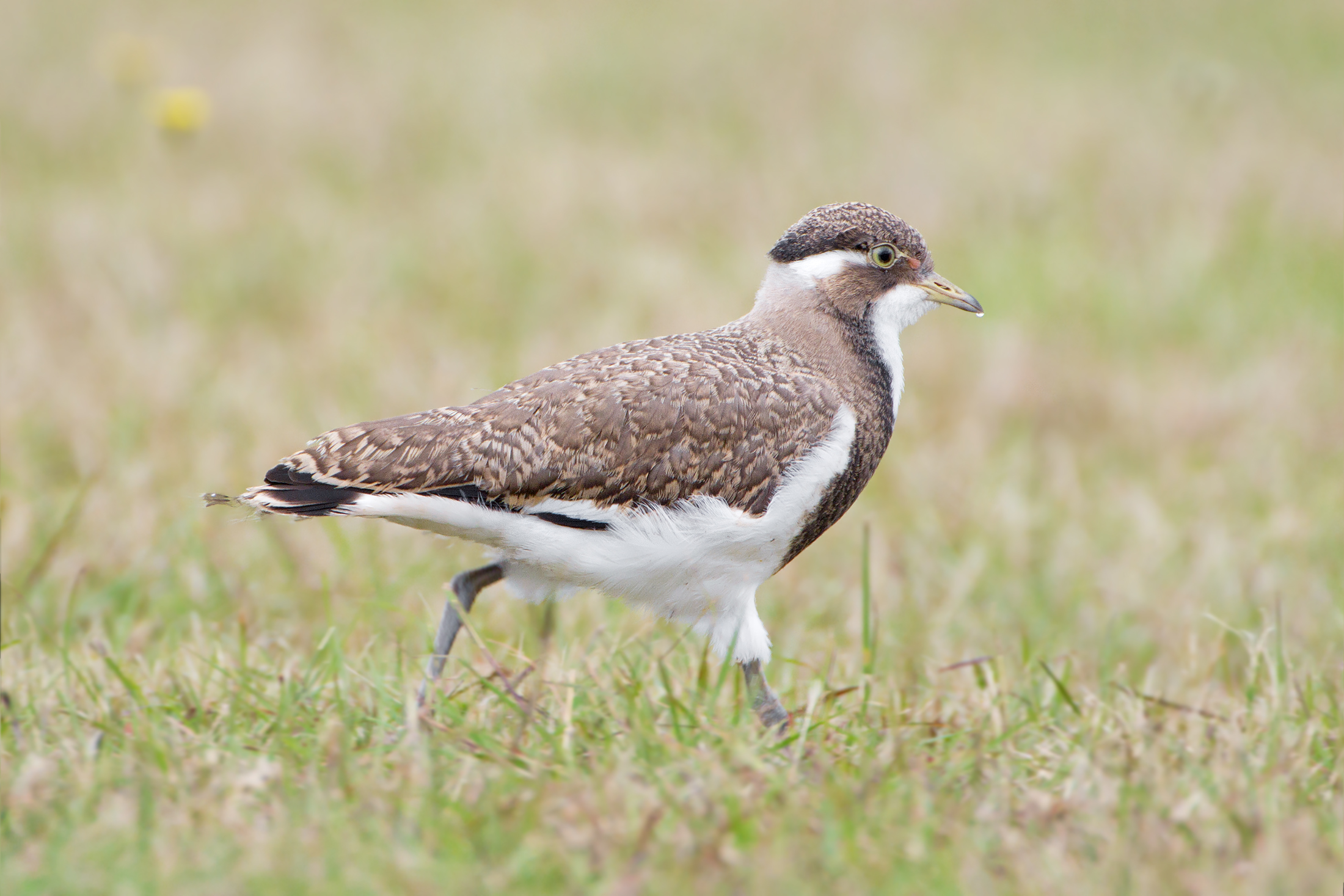
Juvenile

Atkinson's Dam, SE Queensland, Australia

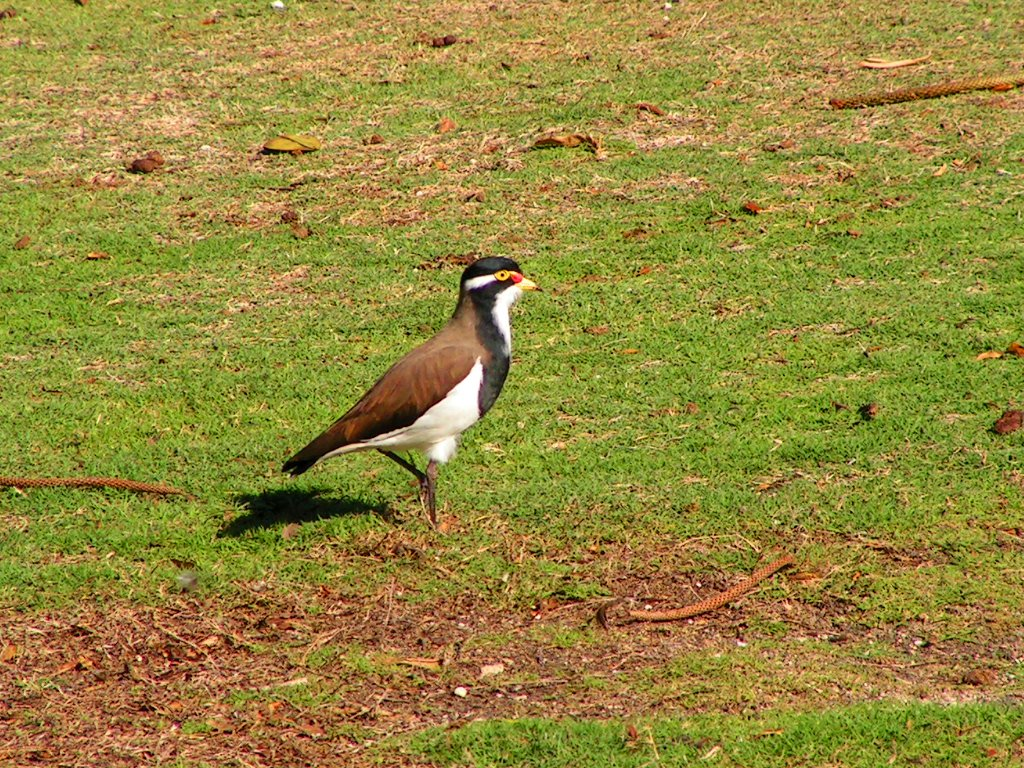
Rottnest Island, Western Australia

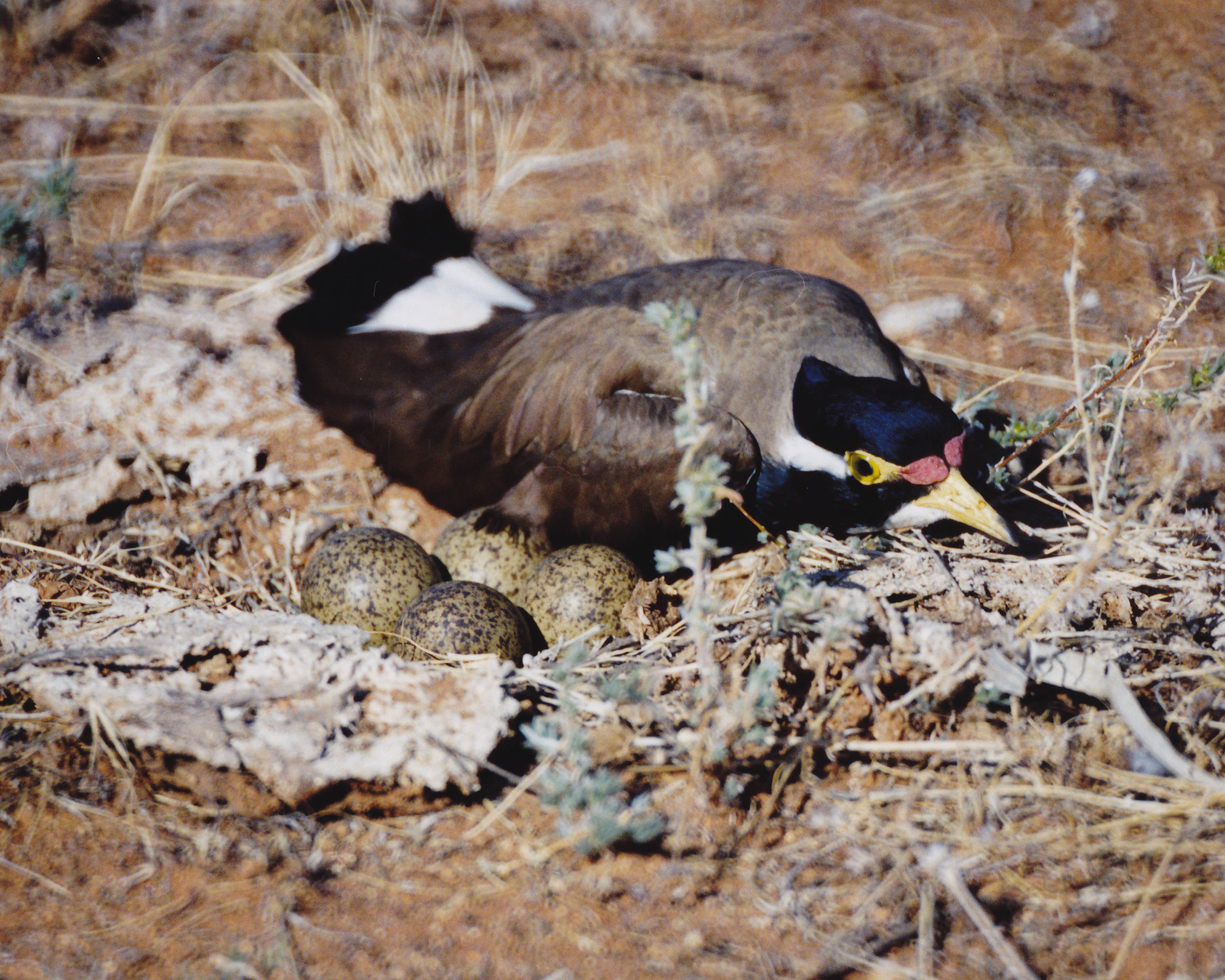
Northern Territory, with eggs
