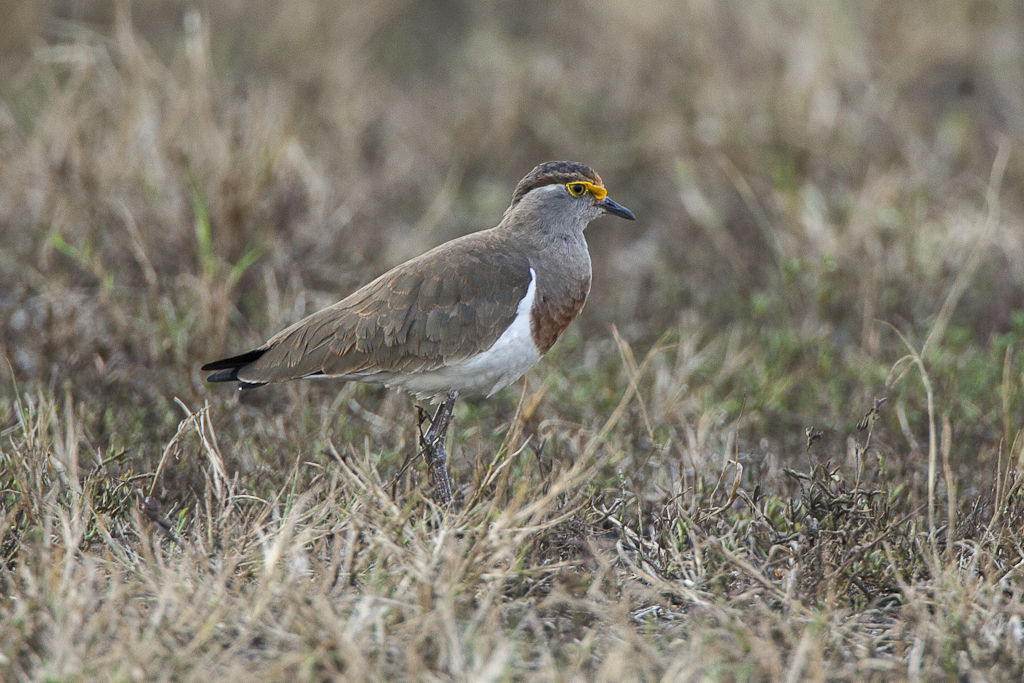

Conservation status
- Least Concern (IUCN 3.1)

Scientific classification
- Kingdom: Animalia
- Phylum: Chordata
- Class: Aves
- Order: Charadriiformes
- Family: Charadriidae
- Genus: Vanellus
- Species: V. superciliosus

Binomial name
- Vanellus superciliosus (Reichenow, 1886)

Synonyms
- Anomalophrys superciliosus (Reichenow, 1886); Lobivanellus superciliosus Reichenow, 1886

= Brown-chested lapwing =

Species of bird

The brown-chested lapwing, also brown-chested wattled plover, (Vanellus superciliosus) is a species of bird in the family Charadriidae. It resides year-round in a narrow strip of land from southwestern Nigeria to northeastern Democratic Republic of the Congo; its wintering range extends toward Lake Chad, Lake Victoria and northern Zambia.

== Diet ==
V. superciliosus is a carnivorous bird feeding on insects, larvae, crickets, bugs, grasshoppers, etc. Their preferred habitat is grassy lands, open savannas or grounds of Mopane forests.
