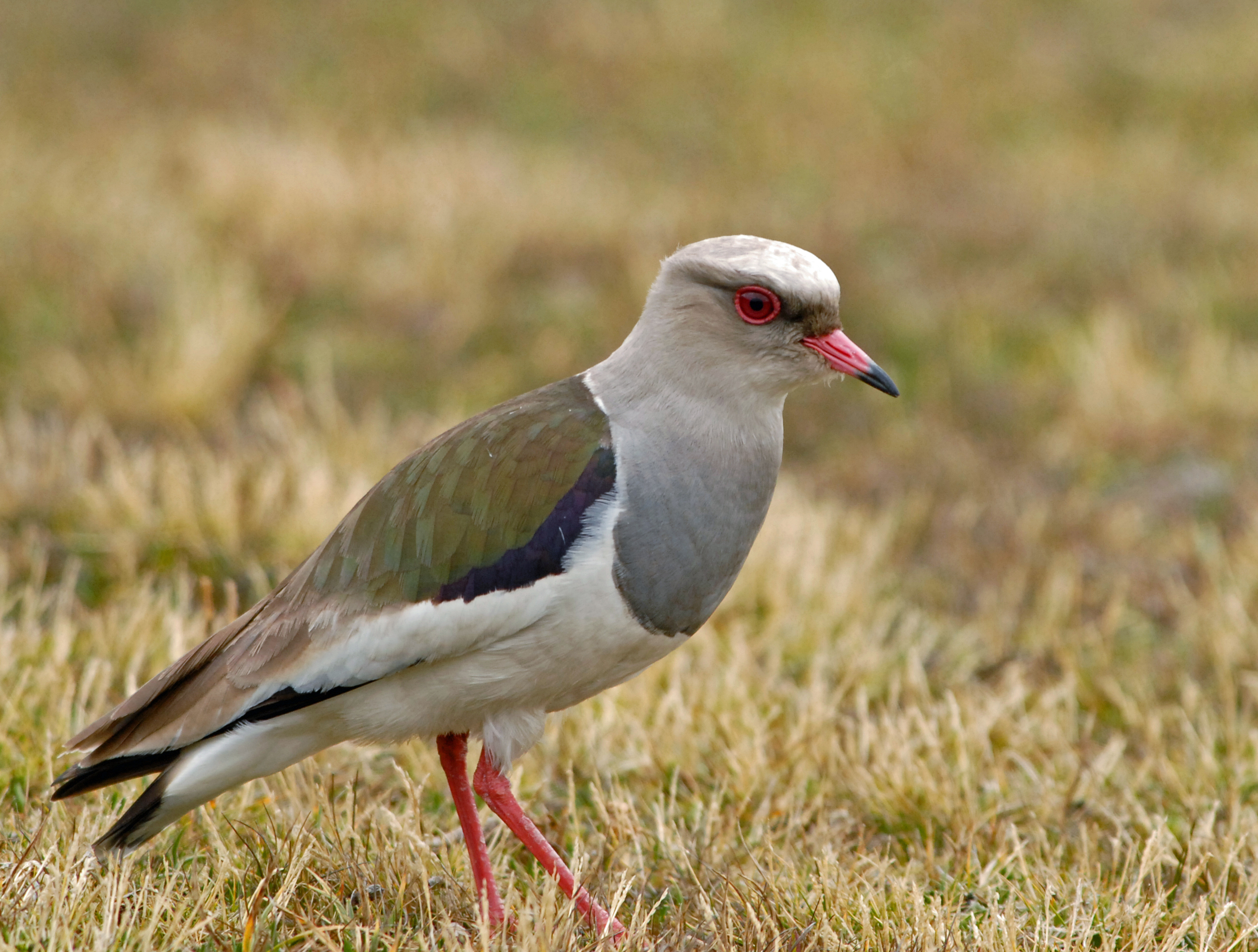

Conservation status
- Least Concern (IUCN 3.1)

Scientific classification
- Kingdom: Animalia
- Phylum: Chordata
- Class: Aves
- Order: Charadriiformes
- Family: Charadriidae
- Genus: Vanellus
- Species: V. resplendens

Binomial name
- Vanellus resplendens (Tschudi, 1843)

Synonyms
- Charadrius resplendens Tschudi, 1843; Ptiloscelys resplendens

= Andean lapwing =

Species of bird

The Andean lapwing (Vanellus resplendens) is a species of bird in family Charadriidae, the plovers and their relatives. It is found in Argentina, Bolivia, Chile, Colombia, Ecuador, and Peru.

== Taxonomy and systematics ==
The Andean lapwing was originally described as Charadrius resplendens and has sometimes been placed in genus Ptiloscelys. It is monotypic.

== Description ==
The Andean lapwing is about 33 cm (13 in) long and weighs 193 to 230 g (6.8 to 8.1 oz). The sexes are alike and have no seasonal changes in plumage. Adults have a creamy gray head and neck with a dark brownish gray patch around the eye. Their upperparts are bronzy green with a purple patch on the wing coverts. Their breast is dark gray and their belly white. Their bill is pinkish orange with a black tip, their eye is reddish, and their legs are also reddish. Juveniles have a brownish head and neck, buff mottling on the breast, and pale buff fringes on the upperparts feathers.

== Distribution and habitat ==
The Andean lapwing is found in the Andes from southwestern Colombia south through Ecuador, Peru, and Bolivia into northern Chile and northwestern Argentina. It inhabits a variety of open landscapes including páramo and puna, shore meadows, and open parts of marshes. It is usually found near lakes or rivers but shuns saline waters. In general it ranges between 2,700 and 4,600 m (8,900 and 15,100 ft) of elevation but is found as high as 5,000 m (16,000 ft) in Chile and as low as 1,500 m (4,900 ft) in the southern parts of its range. It occasionally reaches the coast during the austral winter.

== Behavior ==
=== Movement ===
The Andean lapwing is essentially resident in most of its range but moves to lower elevations during the austral winter.

=== Feeding ===
Nothing is known about the Andean lapwing's foraging techniques or its diet.

=== Breeding ===
The Andean lapwing's breeding season is mostly between October and December though occasionally it may extend to February. One nest was a depression in the ground lined with plant material including lichens. The clutch size is three or four. The incubation period and time to fledging are not known.

=== Vocalization ===
Like most lapwings, the Andean is noisy. "[U]sually heard are a sharp 'wik' in alarm, a harsh 'criee-criee-cri' call, a staccato 'cwi-cwi-cwi...' or more mellow and melodic 'dididi---celeec-celeec-celeec-ce...'." It also makes "a soft querulous 'cow' note...or a low, tremulous 'kwiwiwiwirrr'."

== Status ==
The IUCN has assessed the Andean lapwing as being of Least Concern. It has a large range, and its estimated population of under 6700 mature individuals is believed to be stable. No immediate threats have been identified. "Occupation of bleak high-altitude habitats with relatively low densities of humans suggests [that the] species is probably secure at present."
