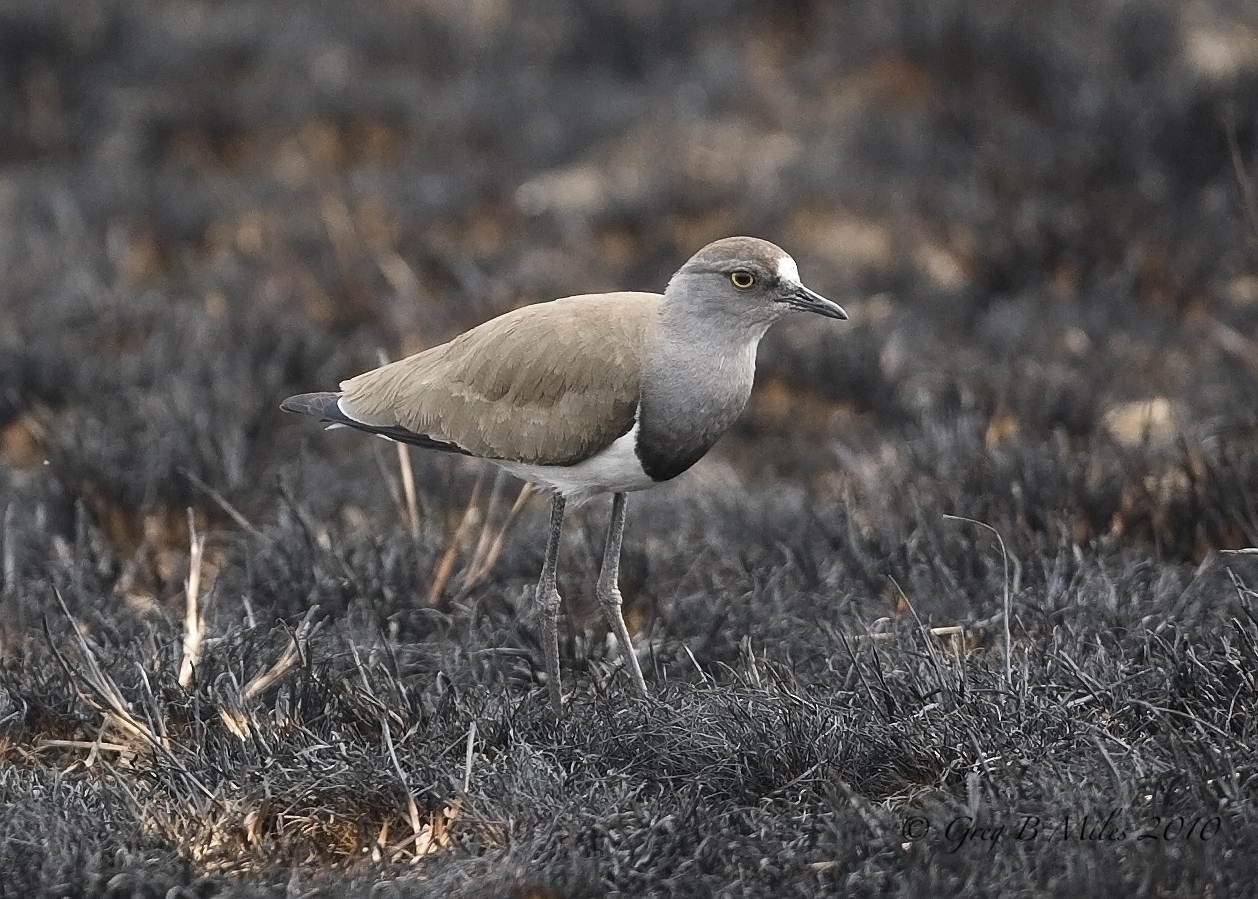

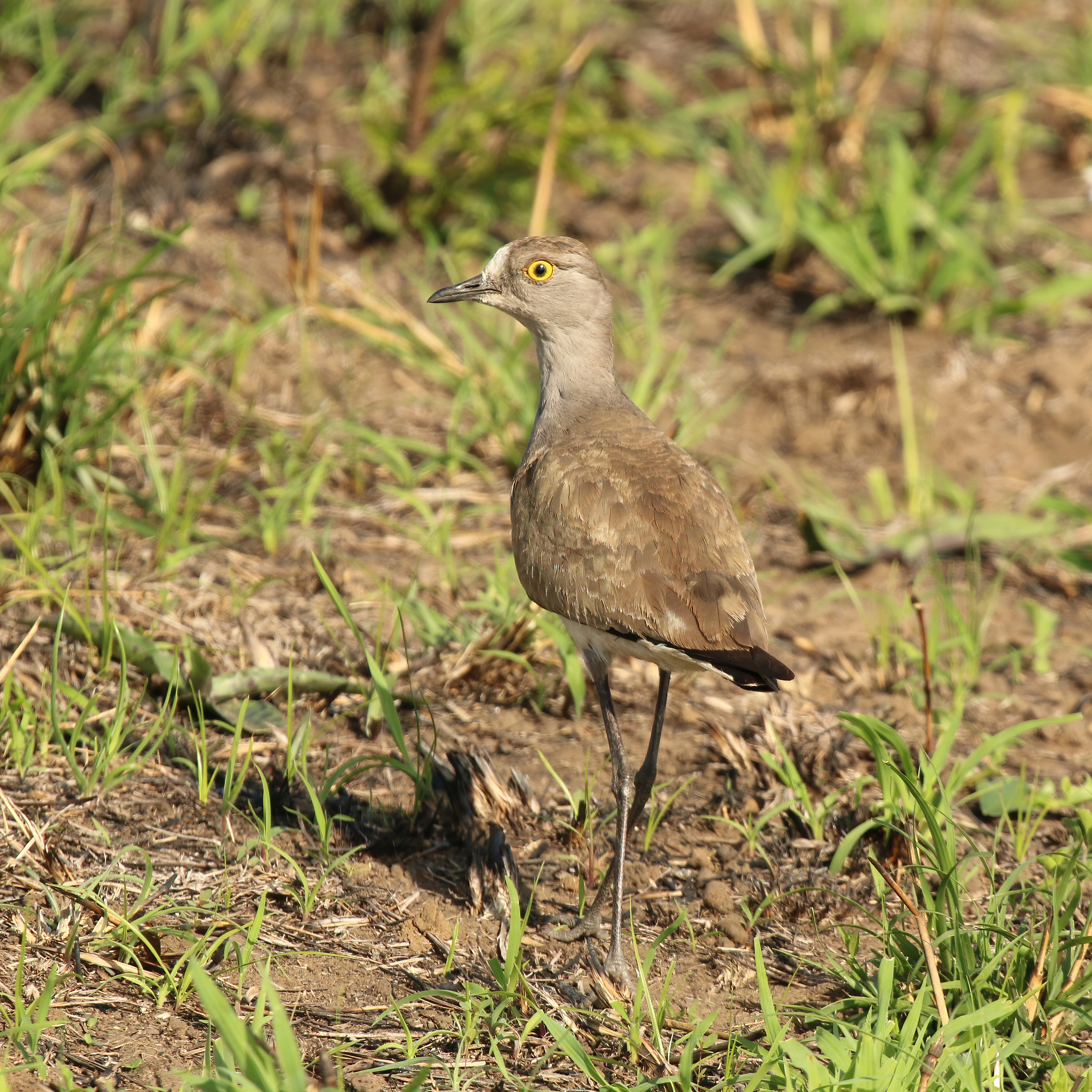

Conservation status
- Least Concern (IUCN 3.1)

Scientific classification
- Kingdom: Animalia
- Phylum: Chordata
- Class: Aves
- Order: Charadriiformes
- Family: Charadriidae
- Genus: Vanellus
- Species: V. lugubris

Binomial name
- Vanellus lugubris (Lesson, 1826)

Synonyms
- Charadrius lugubris Lesson, 1826; Hoplopterus lugubris (Lesson, 1826); Stephanibyx lugubris (Lesson, 1826)

= Senegal lapwing =

Species of bird

The African wattled lapwing (Vanellus senegallus) is sometimes called Senegal wattled plover.

The Senegal lapwing, lesser black-winged lapwing or lesser black-winged plover (Vanellus lugubris) is a species of bird in the family Charadriidae. It is found in the African countries of Angola, Burundi, Cameroon, Republic of the Congo, Democratic Republic of the Congo, Ivory Coast, Eswatini, Gabon, Gambia, Ghana, Guinea, Kenya, Liberia, Malawi, Mali, Mozambique, Nigeria, Rwanda, Senegal, Sierra Leone, Somalia, South Africa, Tanzania, Togo, Uganda, Zambia, and Zimbabwe. It lives primarily in open grassy habitats.
