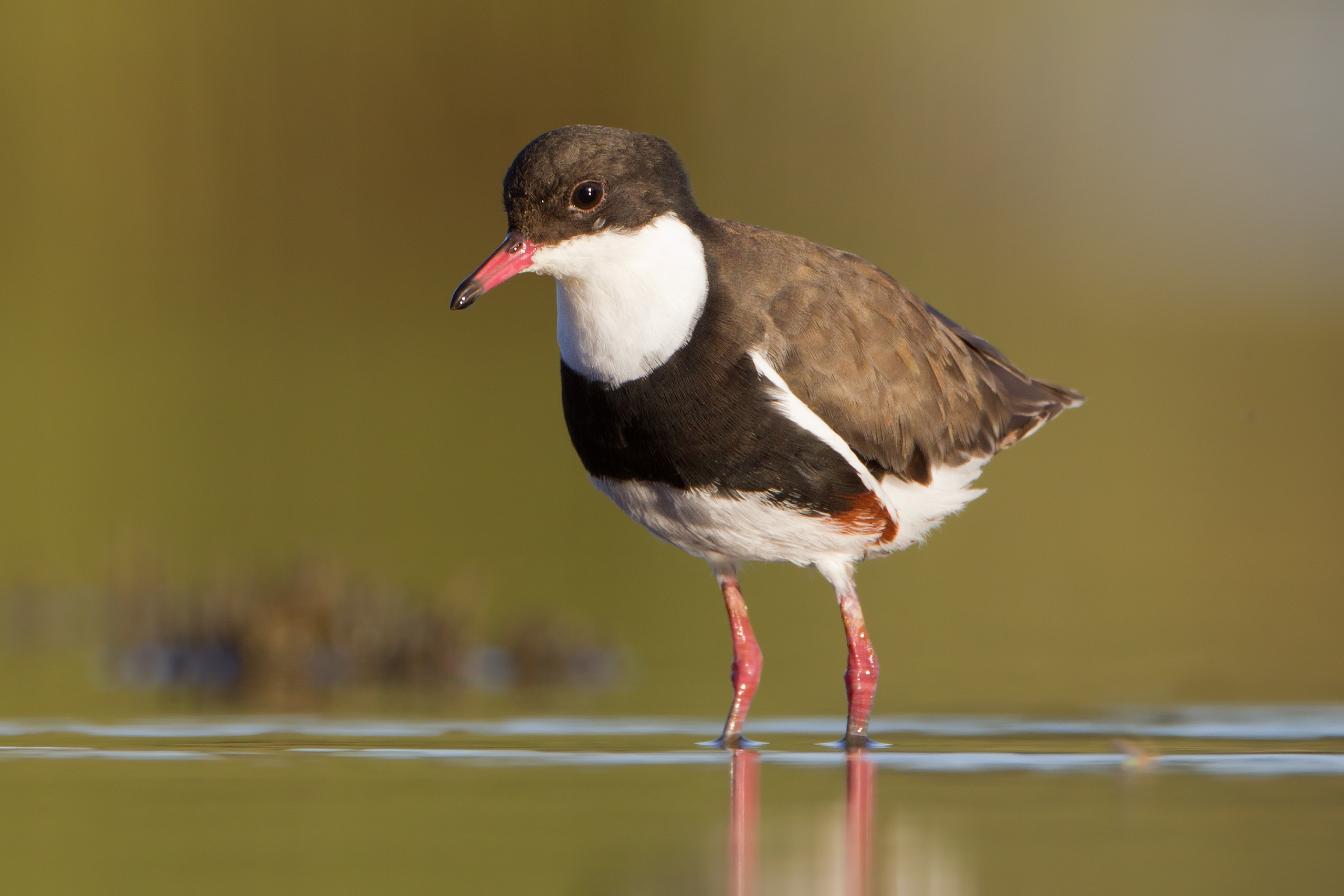

Conservation status
- Least Concern (IUCN 3.1)

Scientific classification
- Kingdom: Animalia
- Phylum: Chordata
- Class: Aves
- Order: Charadriiformes
- Family: Charadriidae
- Genus: Erythrogonys; Gould, 1838
- Species: E. cinctus

Binomial name
- Erythrogonys cinctus Gould, 1838

= Red-kneed dotterel =

Species of bird

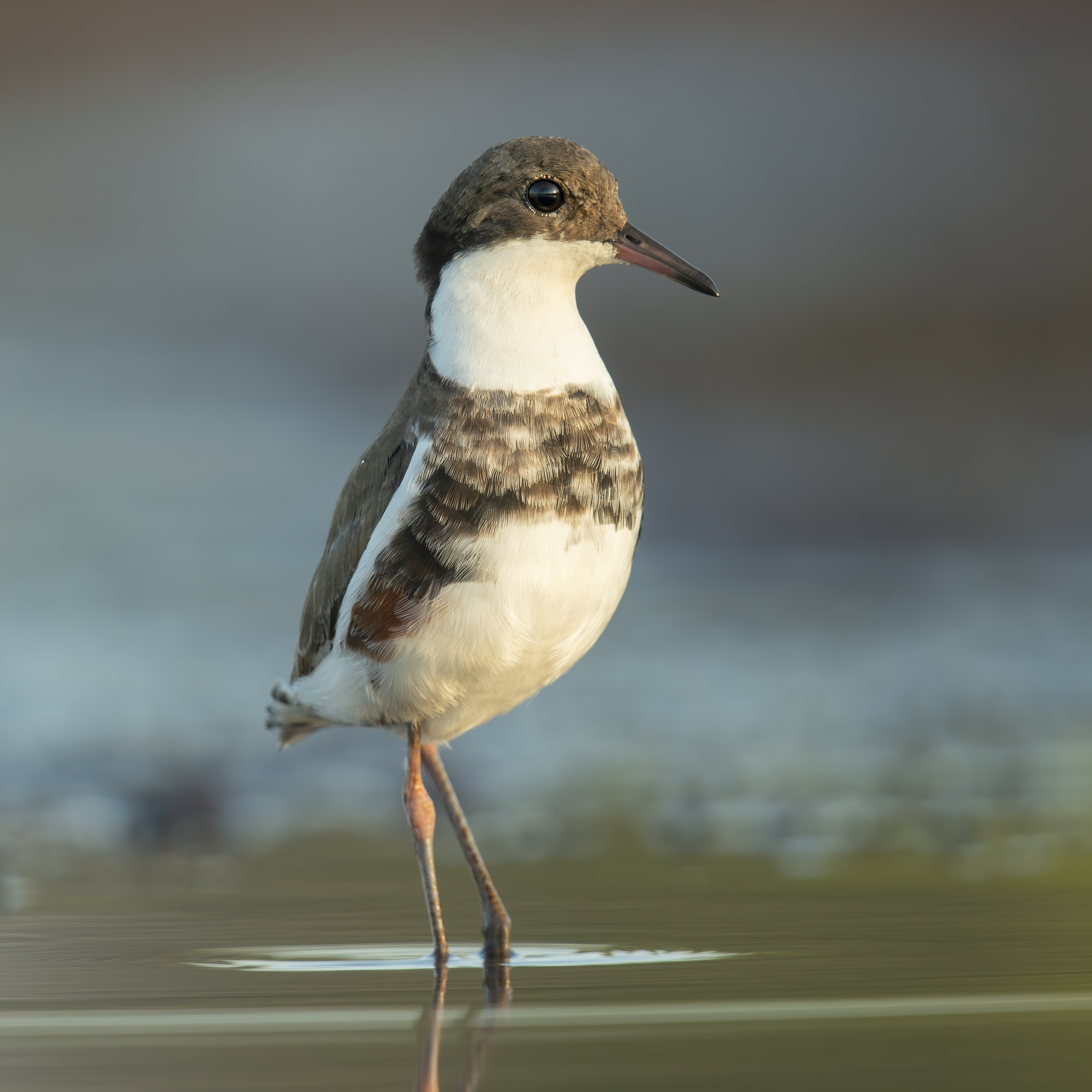
Immature bird in post-juvenile moult

The red-kneed dotterel (Erythrogonys cinctus) is a species of plover in a monotypic genus in the family Charadriidae. It is often gregarious and will associate with other waders of its own and different species, even when nesting. It is nomadic and sometimes irruptive. It closest relatives among other plovers are the genera Peltohyas and Anarhynchus.

== Description ==
Adults distinctively marked, with a black cap or hood from bill, extending below eyes, merging at nape to grey-brown of back. White chin and throat. Broad black band on breast joining nape and also extending to flanks as chestnut stripe. Belly and vent white. Back and mantle grey-brown, mainly black upperwing with white trailing edge. Upper leg, including tarsal joint or "knee", red. Bill red with dark tip.

== Distribution ==
The red-kneed dotterel is native to mainland Australia, Papua New Guinea, and Indonesia, and has occurred as a vagrant in Tasmania, Palau and New Zealand.

== Habitat ==
Mainly margins of shallow ephemeral and permanent freshwater wetlands, occasionally saline wetlands, but rarely tidal wetlands.

== Size ==
The red-kneed dotterel is long-legged and medium-sized (length 17–20 centimetres (6.7–7.9 in), wingspan 33–38 centimetres (13–15 in), weight 40–55 grams (1.4–1.9 oz)).

== Food ==
Arthropods, molluscs, annelids and seeds.

== Breeding ==
The red-kneed dotterel generally breeds from October to January, though it may nest in other months if suitable water conditions exist. It nests on the ground on wetland margins, sometimes using nests of other birds such as hoary-headed grebes. Lays clutch of four cream eggs profusely covered with lines, speckles or blotches. Young precocial and nidifugous.

== Conservation ==
With a large range and no evidence of significant population decline, this species' conservation status is of Least Concern.
