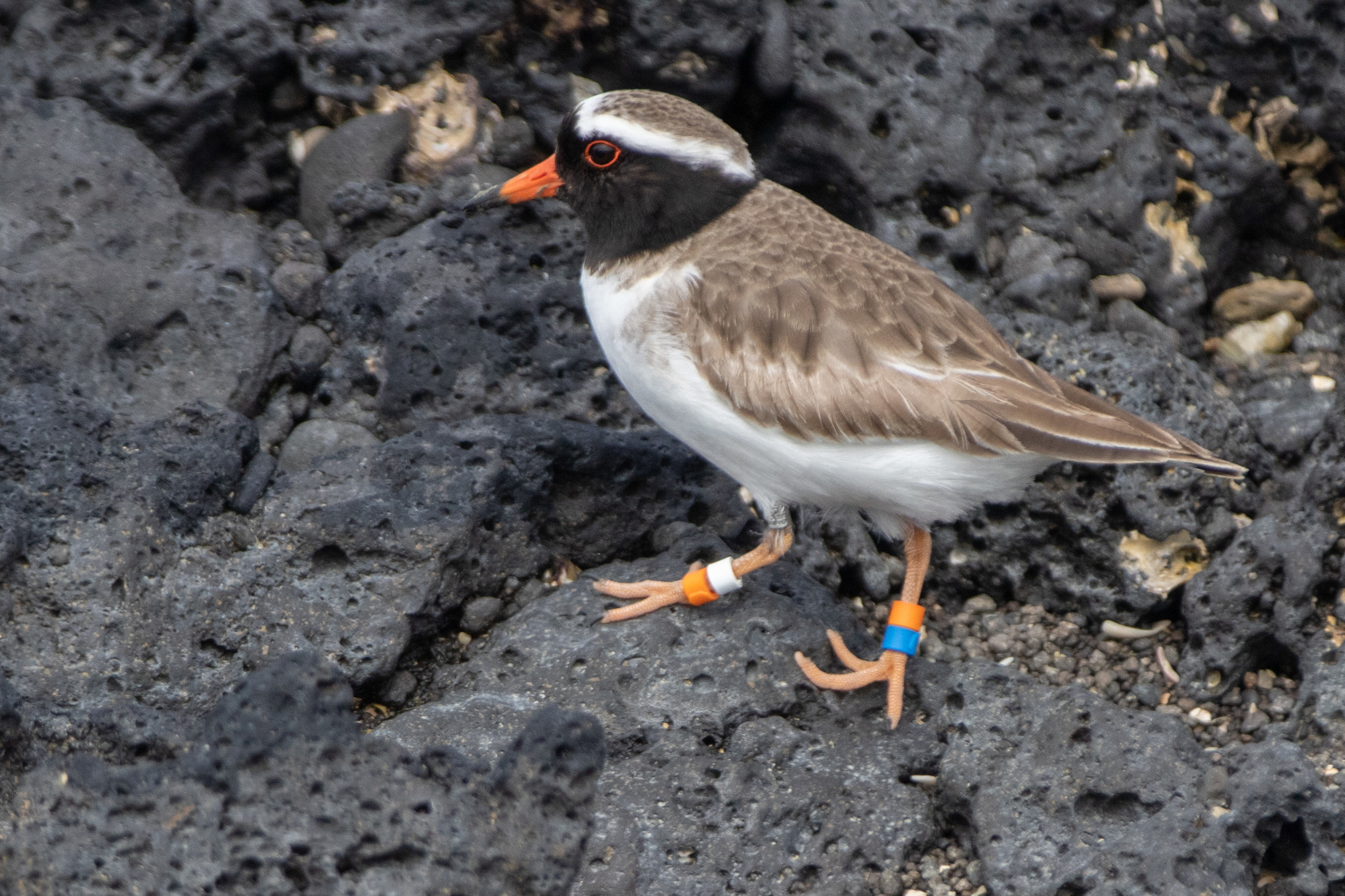
- Shore plover (Thinornis novaeseelandiae)

Scientific classification
- Kingdom: Animalia
- Phylum: Chordata
- Class: Aves
- Order: Charadriiformes
- Family: Charadriidae
- Subfamily: Charadriinae
- Genus: Thinornis; G.R. Gray, 1845

Type species
- Charadrius novaeseelandiae (shore plover) Gmelin, JF, 1789

Species
- See text

= Thinornis =

Genus of birds

Thinornis is a genus of plovers in the family Charadriidae.

== Taxonomy ==
The genus Thinornis was introduced in 1844 by the English zoologist George Robert Gray to accommodate a single species, Thinornis rossii G.R. Gray, which is now considered a junior synonym of Charadrius novaeseelandiae J.F. Gmelin, the shore plover. The genus name combines the Ancient Greek this meaning "beach" or "sand" with ornis meaning "bird". Genetic studies have shown that Thinornis is sister to the genus Charadrius.

The genus contains seven species:

| Image | Common name | Scientific name | Distribution |
|---|---|---|---|
| | Hooded plover | Thinornis cucullatus | southern Australia, including Tasmania |
| | Shore plover | Thinornis novaeseelandiae | Chatham Islands |
| | Black-fronted dotterel | Thinornis melanops | Australia, western Tasmania and New Zealand |
| | Forbes's plover | Thinornis forbesi | grassland and rocky hillsides of western and central Africa |
| | Three-banded plover | Thinornis tricollaris | southern Egypt and sub-Saharan Africa |
| | Long-billed plover | Thinornis placidus | Manchuria and East Asia |
| | Little ringed plover | Thinornis dubius | Eurasia |

An additional species, the Auckland Islands shore plover (Thinornis rossii), known from just one specimen collected in 1840, is now generally considered to be a juvenile shore plover whose location was incorrectly recorded.
