= Muan Tideland =

Wetland in Muan Hyunkyungmeon, South Korea

- IUCN category IV (habitat/species management area)
- Location within South Korea
- Location: Jeollanam-do, South Korea
- Nearest city: Muan
- Coordinates: 35°04′34″N 126°22′30″E
- Area: 35.6 km^{2} (13.7 sq mi)

Ramsar Wetland
- Official name: Muan Tidal Flat
- Designated: 14 January 2008
- Reference no.: 1732

Muan Tideland is a wetland of 35.6 km^{2} (13.7 sq mi) located in Muan Hyunkyungmeon, South Korea. Among many tidelands, Muan Tideland is first to be designated as provincial park. It is a wetland designated as Ramsar wetland and as a wetland of international importance.

== Current status ==
Hampyong Gulf, where Muan tideland is located, has a narrow mouth and a large inner part. The length of the gulf is 17 kilometres (11 mi), its width 1.8 kilometres (1.1 mi), and its area is 344 km^{2} (133 sq mi). Due to effects of sand dunes and naturally eroded soils, Muan tideland consists of special geological features. At the edge of the tideland is an alluvial bed and well-developed sea cliff.

Muan tideland is a place where diverse ecology can be seen. With its shallow water and complicated coastline, Muan is a perfect place for many species to prosper. With many sea organisms, Muan is a tideland ecology sightseeing resort. Muan tideland was designated as Ramsar Convention wetland in January 2008.

== Organisms in Muan ==
Plants

- Zoysiagrass
- Foxtail (Setaria viridis)
- Wild oat (Avena fatua)
- Curled dock (Rumex crispus)
- Sea blite (Suaeda asparagoides)
- 12 other halophytes
- 79 inner water living species

Birds

- Far Eastern curlew (Numenius madagascariensis)
- Long-billed plover (Charadrius placidus)
