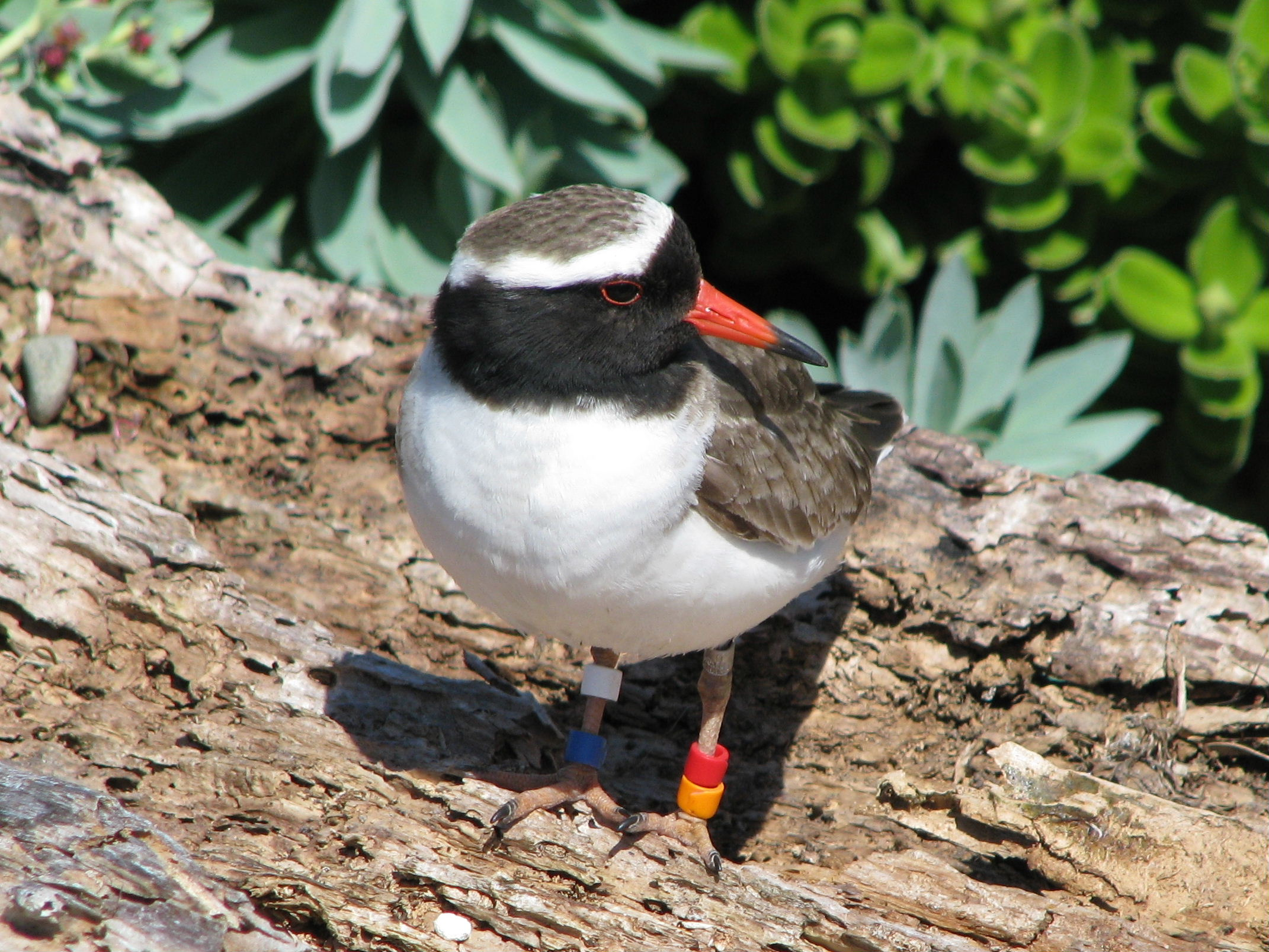
- Shore plover male

Conservation status
- Endangered (IUCN 3.1)

Scientific classification
- Kingdom: Animalia
- Phylum: Chordata
- Class: Aves
- Order: Charadriiformes
- Family: Charadriidae
- Genus: Thinornis
- Species: T. novaeseelandiae

Binomial name
- Thinornis novaeseelandiae (Gmelin, JF, 1789)

Synonyms
- List: Charadrius novae Seelandiae "Gmelin, 1789: Syst. Nat., 13th edition 1(2): 684. Based on the 'New Zealand Plover' of Latham 1785, Gen. Synop. Birds 3(1): 206, pl. 83 – Dusky Sound, Fiordland (fide Medway 2008 [2007], Notornis 54: 116)."; Charadrius Dudoroa "Wagler, 1827: Syst. Avium, Charad.: sp. 14 – New Zealand."; Charadrius Torquatula "J.R. Forster, 1829: in J.G. Wagler, Isis von Oken, Heft 6: col. 652 – Dusky Sound, Fiordland (fide Medway 2008 [2007], Notornis 54: 116)."; Hiaticula Novae Seelandiae "(Gmelin); G.R. Gray 1843, in E. Dieffenbach, Travels in N.Z. 2: 195."; Thinornis novae seelandiae "(Gmelin); G.R.Gray 1845, in Richardson & J.E. Gray (eds), Zool. Voy. 'Erebus' & 'Terror', Birds 1(8): 12, pl. 11."; Thinornis Rossii "G.R. Gray, 1845: in Richardson & J.E. Gray (eds), Zool. Voy. 'Erebus' & 'Terror', Birds 1(8): 12, pl. 11 – 'Auckland Island', error (fide C.A. Fleming 1982, George Edward Lodge. The unpublished N.Z. bird paintings: 245)."; Charadrius atricinctus "Ellman, 1861: Zoologist 19: 7469 – New Zealand."; Thinornis novae zelandiae "(Gmelin); Buller 1865, Essay N.Z. Ornith.: 17. Unjustified emendation."; Thinornis novae zealandiae "(Gmelin); Sharpe 1896, Cat. Birds Brit. Mus. 24: 304. Unjustified emendation."; Thinornis novaeseelandiae "(Gmelin); Mathews & Iredale 1913, Ibis 1 (10th ser.): 253"; Thinornis novae-seelandiae "(Gmelin); Peters 1934, Check-list Birds World 2: 257."; Charadrius novaeseelandiae "Gmelin; Holdaway et al. 2001, New Zealand Journ. Zool. 28(2): 133, 178."

= Shore plover =

Species of bird

The shore plover (Māori: tūturuatu, Moriori: tchūriwat', Thinornis novaeseelandiae), also known as the shore dotterel, is a small plover endemic to New Zealand. Once found all around the New Zealand coast, it is now restricted to a few offshore islands. It is one of the world's rarest shorebirds, with a population of roughly 250.

== Taxonomy ==
The shore plover was formally described in 1789 by the German naturalist Johann Friedrich Gmelin in his revised and expanded edition of Carl Linnaeus's Systema Naturae. He placed it with the plovers in the genus Charadrius and coined the binomial name Charadrius novaeseelandiae. Gmelin based his description on the "New Zealand plover" that had been described and illustrated in 1785 by the English ornithologist John Latham in his A General Synopsis of Birds. The species had been collected near Queen Charlotte Sound. In the late 20th century the shore plover was moved from the original genus Charadrius to its own genus Thinornis, along with the hooded plover later in the early 2000s. A molecular phylogenetic study published in 2015 found that Thinornis was sister to the genus Charadrius. This was confirmed by another study published in 2022. The species is monotypic: no subspecies are recognised.

The "Auckland Islands shore plover" Thinornis rossii, supposedly from the Auckland Islands, is now generally considered to be a juvenile shore plover with an incorrectly recorded location.

== Description ==
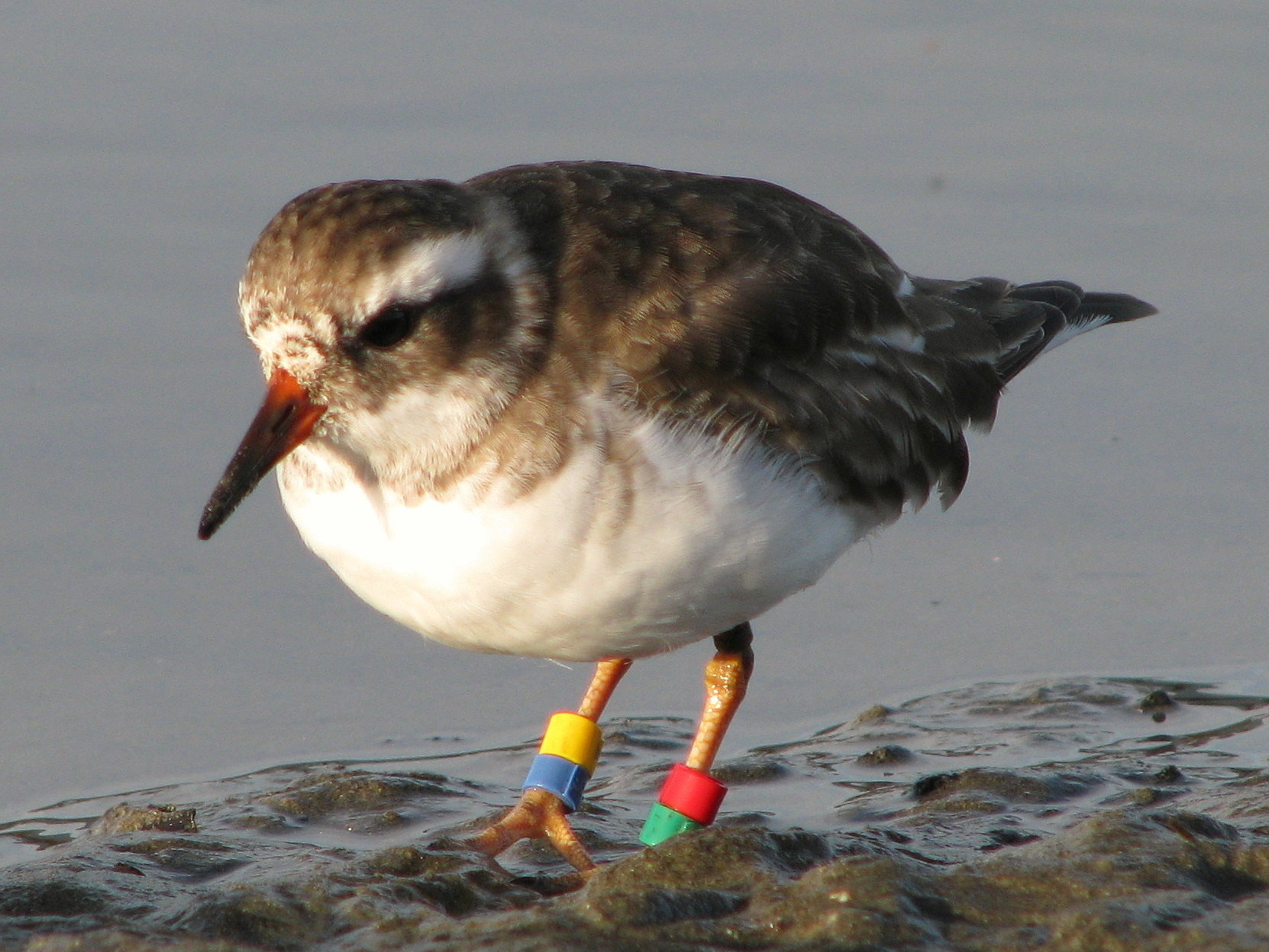
Shore plover juvenile

The shore plover is about 20 cm long, brown above and white below, with a black (male) or brown (female) mask; the brown back feathers have narrow pale fringes, giving a scaly appearance at close range. There is a distinctive white strip circling its head below its brown skullcap. Its legs are bright orange-red, and the bill orange-red (brighter in males than females) with a sharply defined dark tip. The wings are brown with a narrow white wingbar along the full length, and the tail brown with white sides. Juveniles differ in lacking the full dark face mask, and having the brown back feathers with broader pale fringes, giving a more strongly scaly appearance above.

== Distribution ==
Although this species was historically found only on the New Zealand coast, subfossil shore plover bones have been recovered from roosts of the extinct laughing owl near rivers many kilometres inland. Cook's second expedition collected them from opposite ends of the South Island, in Fiordland and the Marlborough Sounds. There are 19th century reports of shore plovers from the South Island and several parts of the North Island, but by the 1870s they had vanished from the mainland, surviving only on the Chatham Islands. Introduced predators such as feral cats and brown rats were the main culprits in their decline. In 2026 the Shore Plover Recovery Group confirmed that a chick had fledged on Pitt Island, the first time this has occurred in 150 years.

== Breeding ==
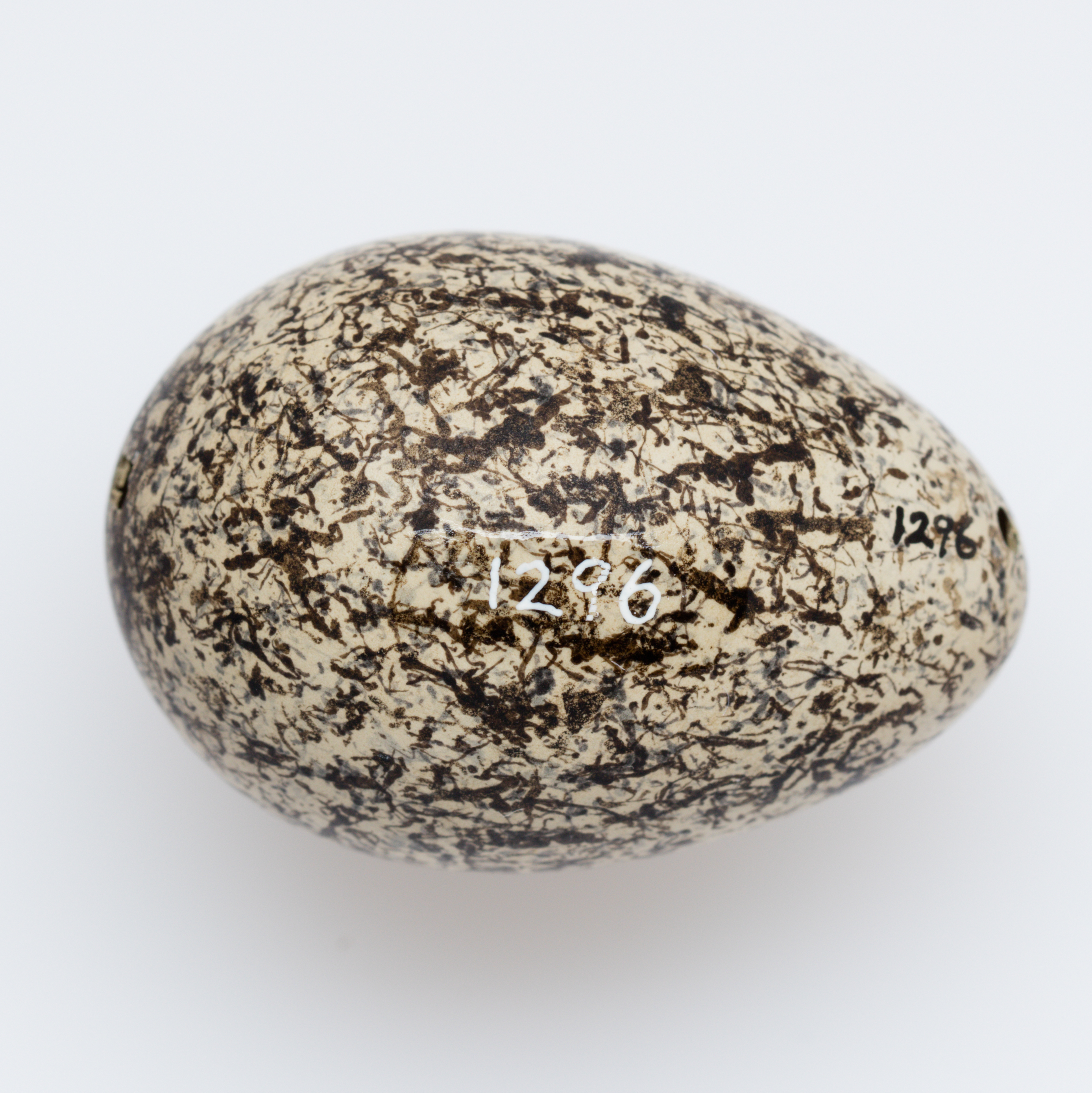
Egg, Auckland Museum collection

Shore plovers (unusually for shorebirds) nest under cover (such as driftwood and vegetation) or in burrows under boulders. This is likely to be for protection against avian predators; in their current range, skuas and gulls, while past predators would have included the laughing owl and the New Zealand falcon. This is one of the reasons for their decline, as such nests are more vulnerable to mammalian predators.

In the early 1990s, the Department of Conservation (DOC) started a captive breeding programme at Pukaha / Mount Bruce National Wildlife Centre, and later at Isaac Conservation and Wildlife Trust. From a captive population of around 6–10 pairs, over 500 captive-bred juveniles have been released into the wild.

== Conservation ==
Shore plovers are endangered, with a global population of around 250 birds. The species survived on only one island, Rangatira, in the Chatham Islands, from where it has since been reintroduced to other offshore islands, such as Mangere Island in the Chathams, Mana Island near Wellington and Motutapu near Auckland. The world population was roughly 70 breeding pairs in 1937 and their habitat was declared a reserve in 1954. The population fluctuated in the 1980s, with only 40 breeding pairs in 1982, rising to 80 pairs in 1987 and a high of 94 pairs in 2010. A second wild population of about 20 birds was discovered in 1999 living on Western Reef off Chatham Island, but it gradually declined, and the last bird was taken into captivity in 2003. As of 2016, the wild population comprised 66 breeding pairs, 56 of them in the Chatham Islands. DOC has a stated goal of increasing the population to 250 in five different habitats.

DOC moved a number of captive-reared juveniles to Mana Island, off Wellington's western coast, between March and May 2007. They bred within months of their arrival, and in February 2008 twenty more were translocated. From a high of 87 individuals, the population was reduced to just 10 from the effects of a single brown rat.

Birds had also been translocated since 2000 to Waikawa (Portland Island), a privately owned island off the Māhia Peninsula in Hawke's Bay. In 2012, the population on Waikawa was discovered to have crashed by 75% to just 20 birds, apparently due to predation by a brown rat. Twelve eggs were rescued for translocation to Mana Island.

A total of 42 captive-bred shore plovers were released onto Motutapu Island in 2012 in the hope they would become established there and on other pest-free islands in the Hauraki Gulf. The birds repeatedly flew away, and only five were still present in 2015 when nineteen more were released. Motutapu had its mammalian predators removed in 2010, and the breeding population there increased from one pair in 2015 to three pairs in 2016. These birds are currently the most accessible to the public.

Six juveniles were released into the wild in 2018. Four additional juveniles were released in February 2019 with a further 21 due to be released on 25 March, having been bred at the Pūkaha National Wildlife Centre. Five more juvenile birds were transported from a captive breeding program in Christchurch to Mana Island in April 2020.
