= Chongdan Field =

Wetland in North Korea

Coordinates: 37°58′00″N 125°56′00″E

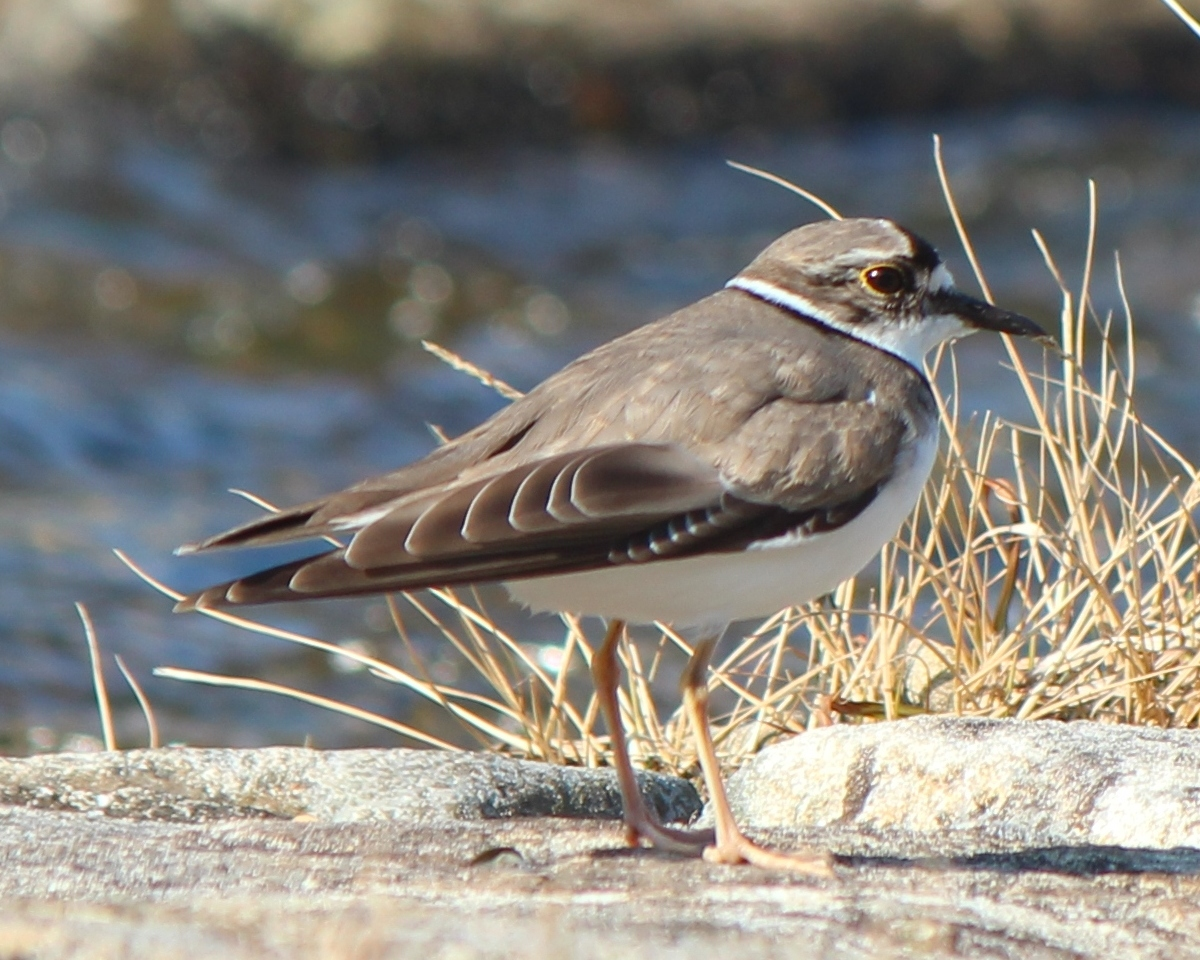
The site is important for long-billed plovers

Chongdan Field(청단군습지) is a 1,000 ha wetland protected area in South Hwanghae Province of North Korea. It and its surrounds, including rice paddies, have been identified by BirdLife International as a 2500 ha Important Bird Area (IBA) because it supports populations of swan geese, whooper swans, black-faced spoonbills, red-crowned cranes, long-billed plovers, Far Eastern curlews and Nordmann's greenshanks.
