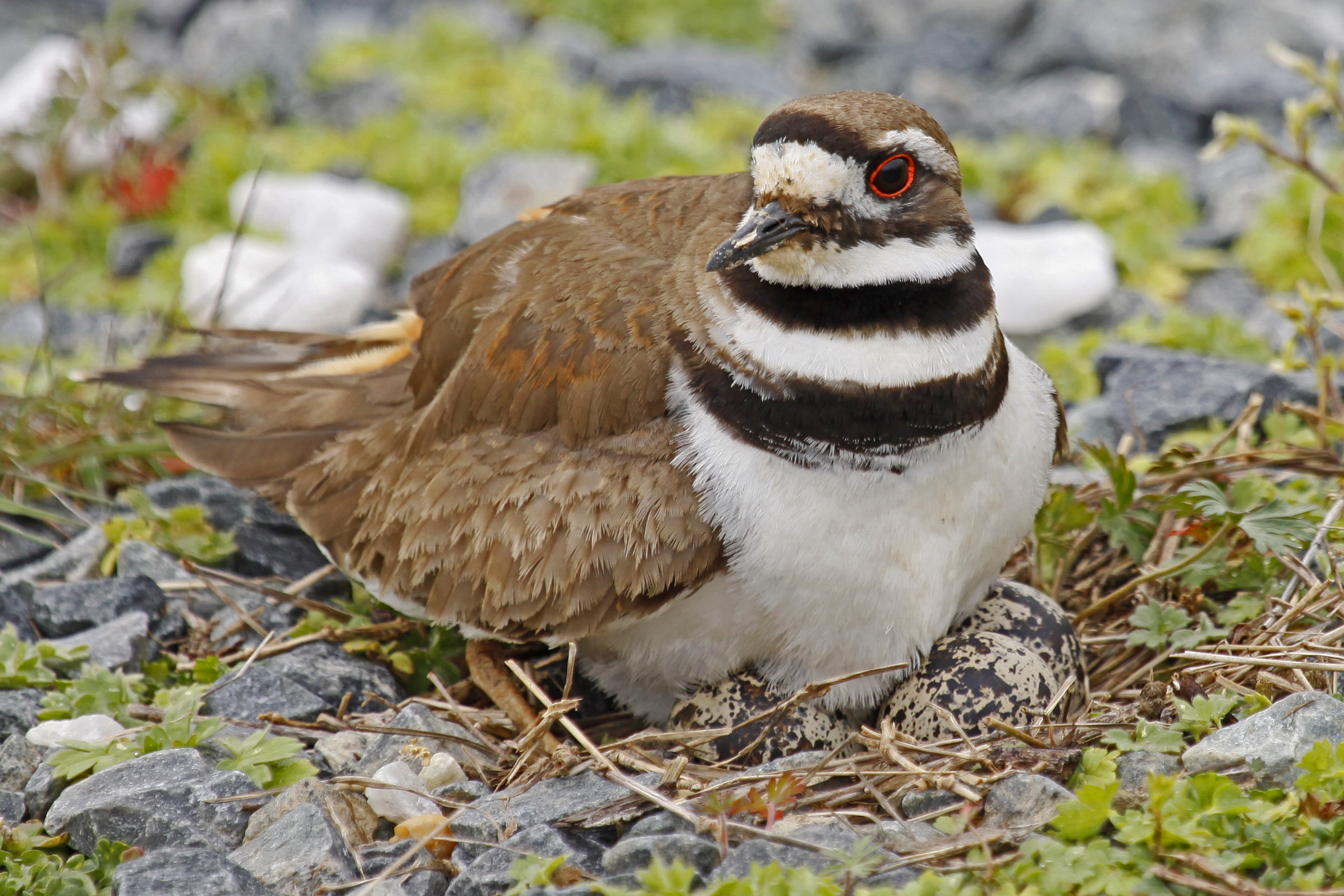
- Killdeer (Charadrius vociferus)

Scientific classification
- Kingdom: Animalia
- Phylum: Chordata
- Class: Aves
- Order: Charadriiformes
- Family: Charadriidae
- Subfamily: Charadriinae
- Genus: Charadrius; Linnaeus, 1758

Type species
- Charadrius hiaticula (common ringed plover) Linnaeus, 1758

Species
- See text

Synonyms
- Aegialites / Aegialitis; Elseyornis Mathews, 1914

= Charadrius =

Genus of birds

Charadrius is a genus of plovers, a group of wading birds. The genus name Charadrius is a Late Latin word for a yellowish bird mentioned in the fourth-century Vulgate. They are found throughout the world.

Many Charadrius species are characterised by their plumage pattern, being breast bands or collars. In the adult, the patterns are single complete bands (ringed, semipalmated, little ringed, long-billed), or double or triple bands (killdeer, three-banded, Forbes'). They have relatively short bills and feed mainly on insects, worms, or other invertebrates, depending on habitat. Prey is obtained by a run-and-pause technique, rather than the steady probing of some other wader groups; they hunt by sight, rather than by feel (tactile sense) as do longer-billed waders like snipe or curlews.

== Taxonomy ==
The genus Charadrius was introduced in 1758 by the Swedish naturalist Carl Linnaeus in the tenth edition of his Systema Naturae. The name had been used (as Charadrios sive Hiaticula) by the Italian naturalist Ulisse Aldrovandi in 1603 for the common ringed plover. The word is Late Latin and is mentioned in the Vulgate Bible. It derives from the Ancient Greek χαραδριος/kharadrios, an unidentified plain-coloured nocturnal bird that was found in ravines and river valleys (from kharadra, "ravine"). (Note: Leviticus Chapter 11 Verse 19.) The type species is the common ringed plover. However, it once appeared that the taxonomy of “Charadrius” was erroneous, as for example the Kentish plover is more closely related to lapwings than it is to, say, the greater ringed plover. Hence, either all members of Charadriidae, excluding Pluvialis are grouped in a single genus, Charadrius, or the genus is reduced to the common ringed plover, piping plover, semipalmated plover, and killdeer. The latter option was chosen.

Based on a molecular phylogenetic study by Natalie Dos Remedios and collaborators that was published in 2015 and another study by David Cerný and Rossy Natale published in 2022, the generic boundaries in the family Charadriidae have been changed to create monophyletic genera. The genetic results show that Charadrius is sister to the genus Thinornis and that the two genera shared a common ancestor around 18 million years ago. Here, they are treated as separate genera rather than an alternative treatment in which Charadrius is expanded to include the species in Thinornis.

=== Species ===
The genus now contains four species:

Image	Scientific name	Common name	Distribution
	Charadrius vociferus	Killdeer	North America ; winters to Central and northwestern South America
	Charadrius hiaticula	Common ringed plover	arctic and northern Europe ; winters to Africa and southern Asia
	Charadrius semipalmatus	Semipalmated plover	North America
	Charadrius melodus	Piping plover	central/eastern North America
