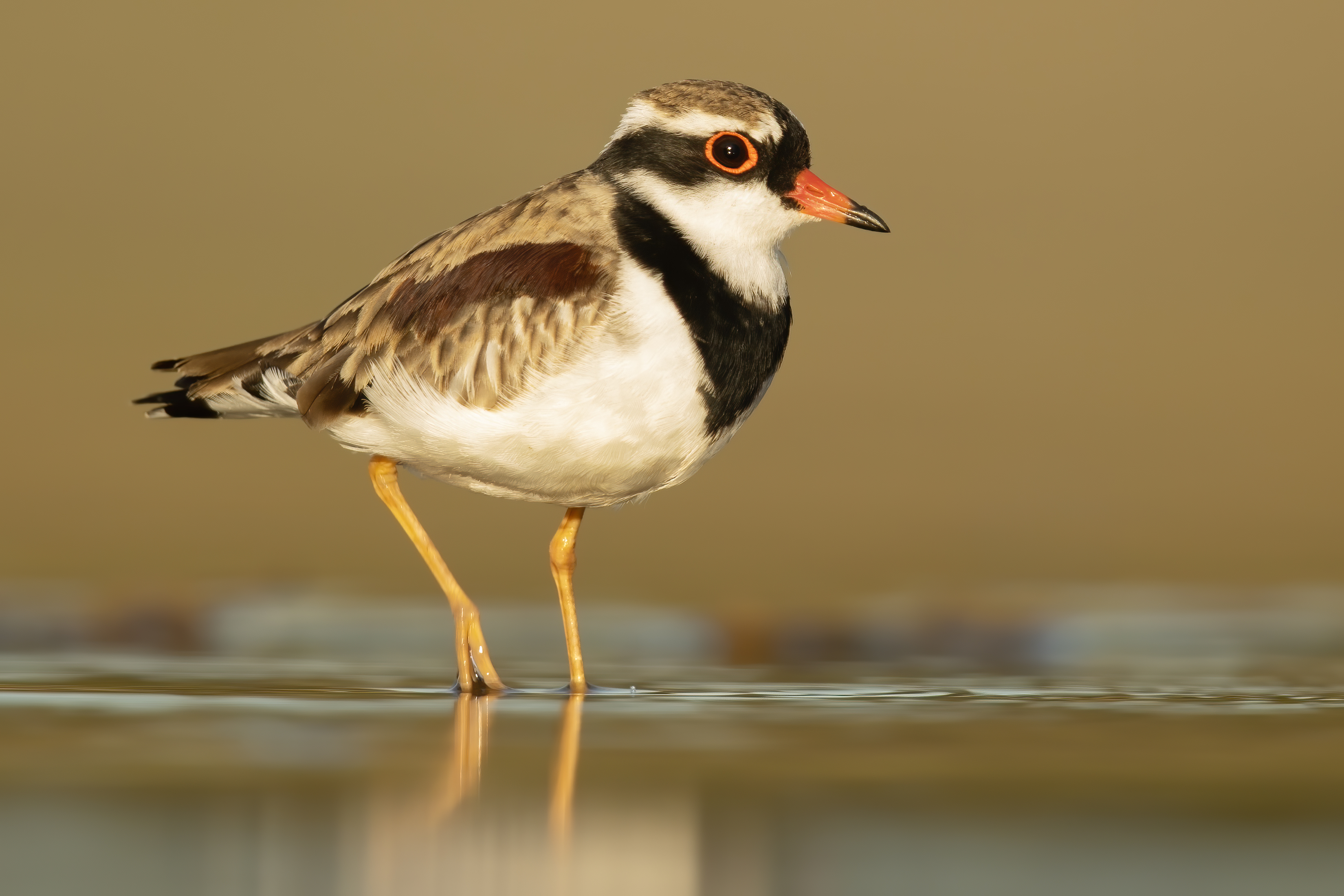

Conservation status
- Least Concern (IUCN 3.1)

Scientific classification
- Kingdom: Animalia
- Phylum: Chordata
- Class: Aves
- Order: Charadriiformes
- Family: Charadriidae
- Genus: Thinornis
- Species: T. melanops

Binomial name
- Thinornis melanops (Vieillot, 1818)
- Resident

Synonyms
- Charadrius melanops

Audio

= Black-fronted dotterel =

Species of bird

The black-fronted dotterel (Thinornis melanops) is a small plover in the family Charadriidae that is found throughout much of Australia and New Zealand.

== Taxonomy ==
The black-fronted dotterel was formally described in 1818 by the French ornithologist Louis Pierre Vieillot under the binomial name Charadrius melanops. The type locality was subsequently designated as New South Wales. The specific epithet combines the Ancient Greek melops meaning "black" with ōps meaning "face". This species was previously placed in the monotypic genus Elseyornis but a molecular phylogenetic study published in 2022 found that it was embedded in a clade containing members of the genus Thinornis. The black-fronted dotterel was therefore moved to Thinornis. The species is monotypic: no subspecies are recognised.

== Description ==
As an adult, this small shorebird has an overall length of 16–18 cm (6.3–7.1 in), a wingspan of 33–35 cm (13–14 in) and a weight of 30–35 g (1.1–1.2 oz). The sexes are similar in appearance. It has a distinct black face mask, forehead and v-shaped band across the chest. Dorsally it is a mottled brown colour with the wings and crown of the head the same colour. This colouration is particularly useful for camouflage against aerial predators. Orbital eye rings and the first section of the bill are red, with the latter being black at the tip. The legs are pale orange. Unlike many other wading birds, black-fronted dotterels retain the same plumage all year round.

Juveniles are duller in colour with a greyish beak and lacking the black breast band and forehead.

== Distribution and habitat ==
The black-fronted dotterel is native to mainland Australia and Tasmania. They inhabit most of the continent, save for parts of the Great Victoria Desert. It is rare to spot them along the coasts, but they're known to inhabit the nearby wetlands and basins. The species self-introduced itself to parts of New Zealand in the 1950s, with the bird first being spotted in Hawke's Bay in 1954. From then onward, there were multiple recorded sightings of the dotterel in other regions of New Zealand, such as Manawatu and North Canterbury, dating 1955 and 1956 respectively. Eventually, the species spread out to the South Island in the 1970s. As of 2016, the black-fronted dotterel officially inhabits most of New Zealand, with some of their key breeding spots being the Wairau and the Awatere rivers.

Black-fronted dotterels are commonly spotted in south-western Queensland and northern New South Wales in Australia, and Hawke’s Bay in New Zealand. Black-fronted dotterels live along the edges of freshwater sources. They include wetlands, lakes, dams and billabongs, as well as shallow, temporary claypan pools. Although not as common, they have also been noted to inhabit mudflats and estuaries. Black-fronted dotterels are typically sedentary birds that occupy a set territory on a semi-regular basis, with some birds sometimes traveling considerable distances to reach food-rich areas. Dotterels have also been recorded to move around due to rainfall, leaving the area with higher waters and returning once the area dries up to its normal levels.

== Behaviour and ecology ==
=== Food and feeding ===
Their diet consists of crustaceans, insects and seeds. They forage in a series of short running motions, holding the body horizontal, stopping to peck from time to time with a rapid bobbing motion.

=== Breeding ===
The black-fronted dotterel breeds between August and February, although is known to breed anytime conditions are right e.g. after suitable rains in Northern Australia. During courtship, both species will call and participate in aerial displays.

The nest is a small depression that can consist of twigs, shells and pebbles. The eggs are a greyish-yellow colour with brown and lavender markings. Incubation of the 2-3 eggs is shared between both parents. When one parent is not incubating, they still rest and feed close to the nest. During incubation, if the eggs get too hot the adults will stand over the eggs to shade them from the harsh sun or wet the feathers on their stomach to wet and cool the eggs. The egg gestation period is 4–5 weeks. Twenty-four hours after they hatch the chicks leave the nest to hide in less exposed areas, while at the same time both parents look after them. Both parents will call loudly and feign injury to lure predators away from the nest.

== Status ==
As of 2021, the black-fronted dotterel population has been confirmed to be stable in New Zealand. They are marked as Least Concern by the IUCN Red List. Their population is steadily increasing.

== Gallery ==
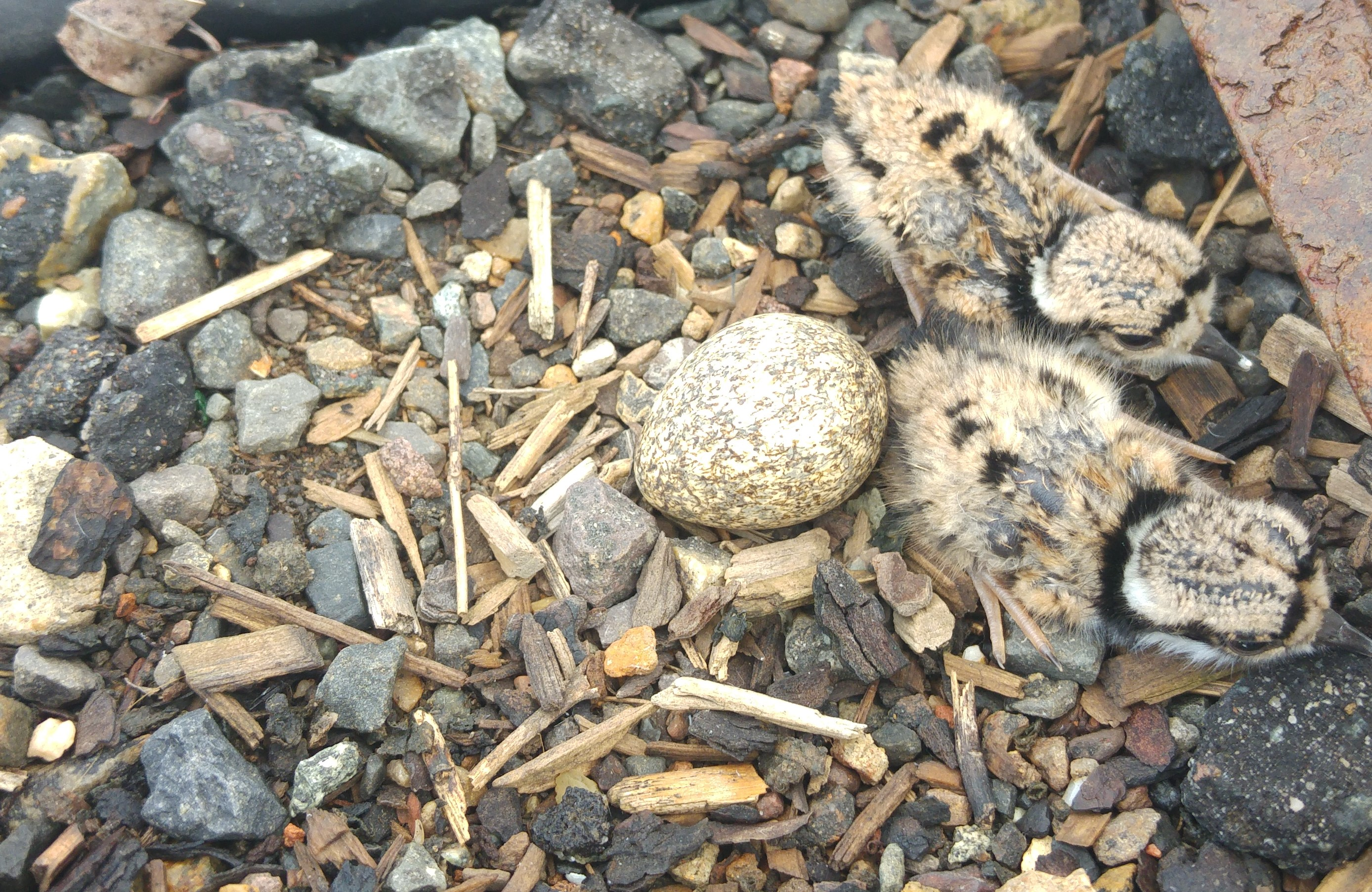
Shortly after hatching

Tamborine, SE Queensland, Australia

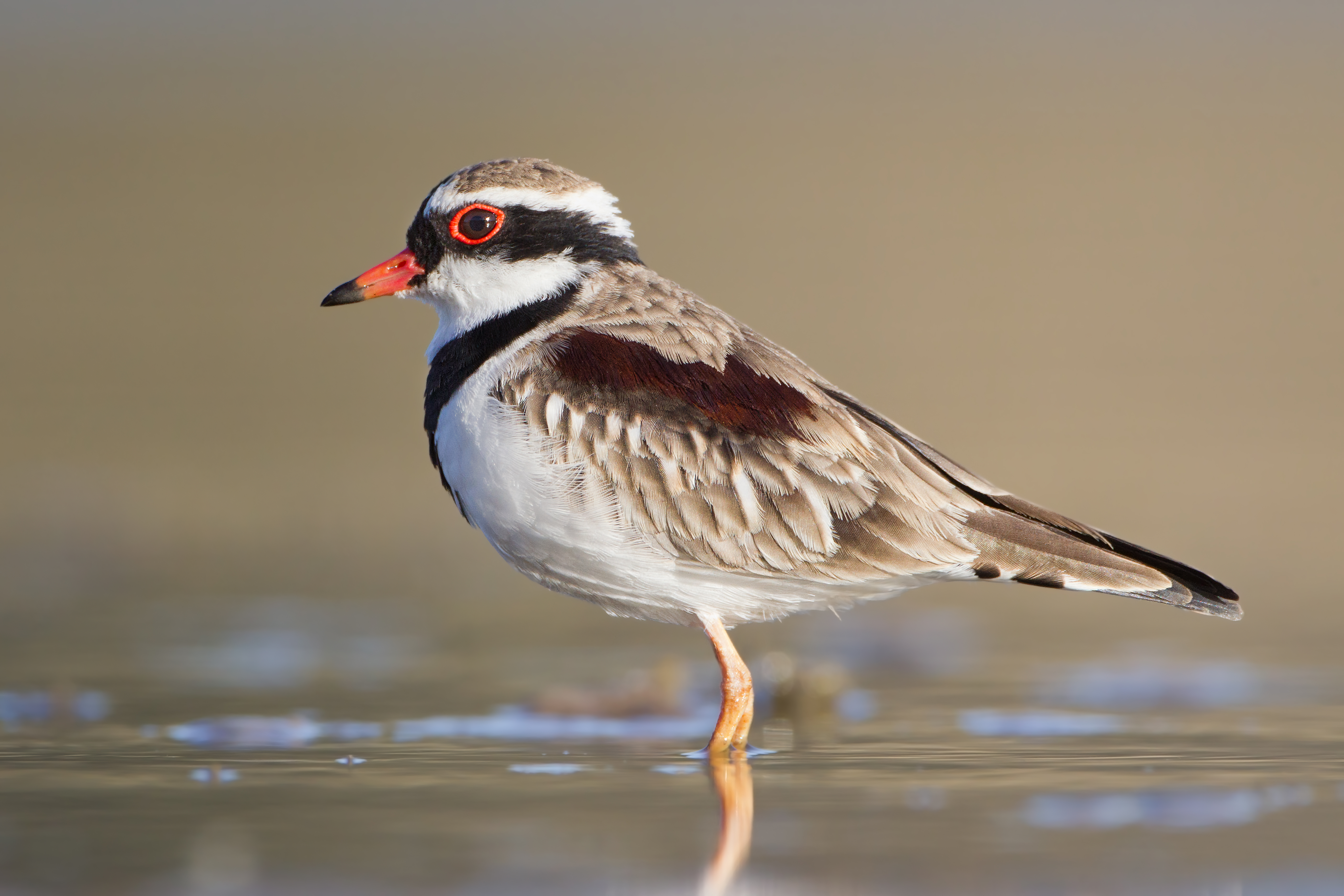
Chiltern, Victoria, Australia

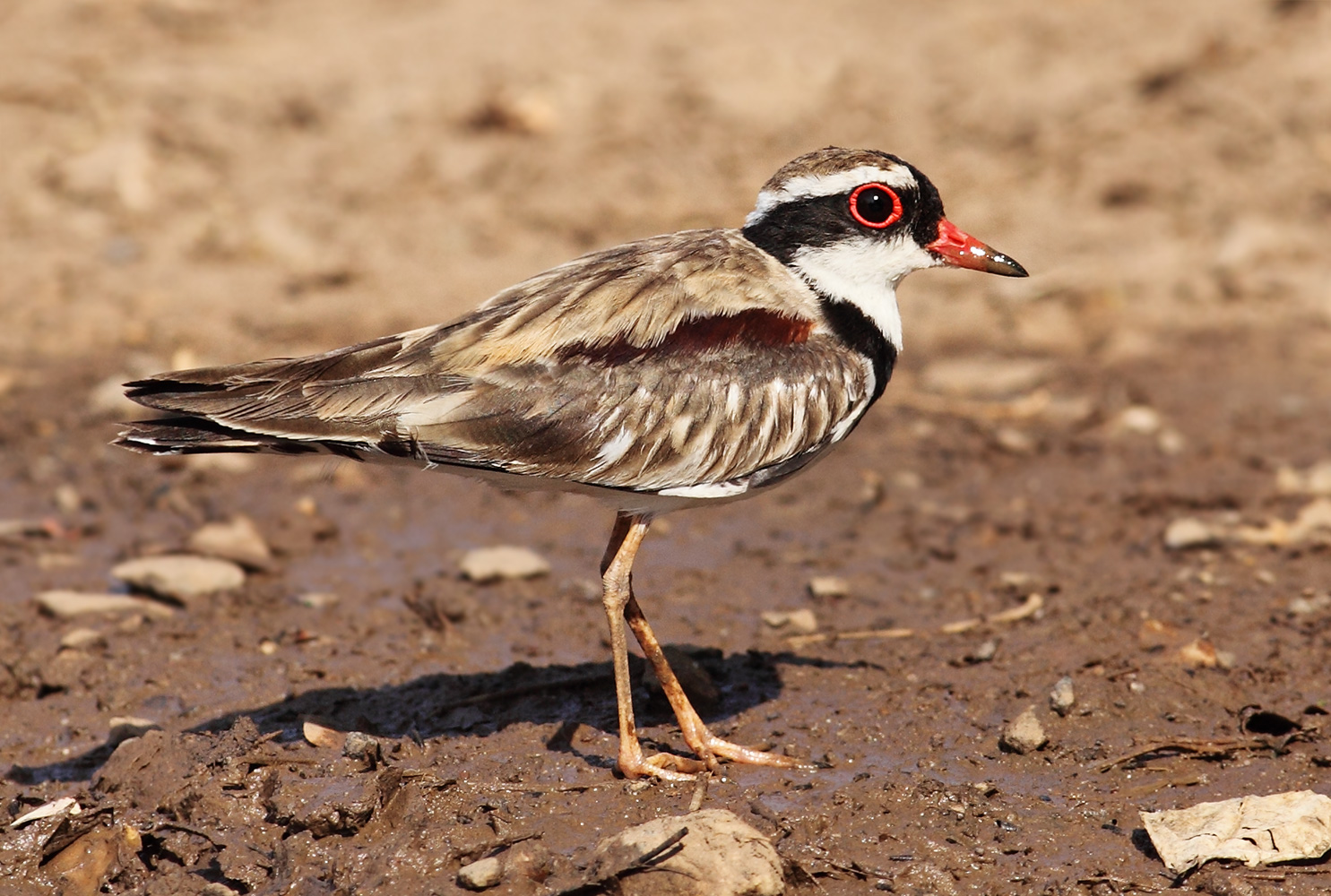
Northern Territory, Australia

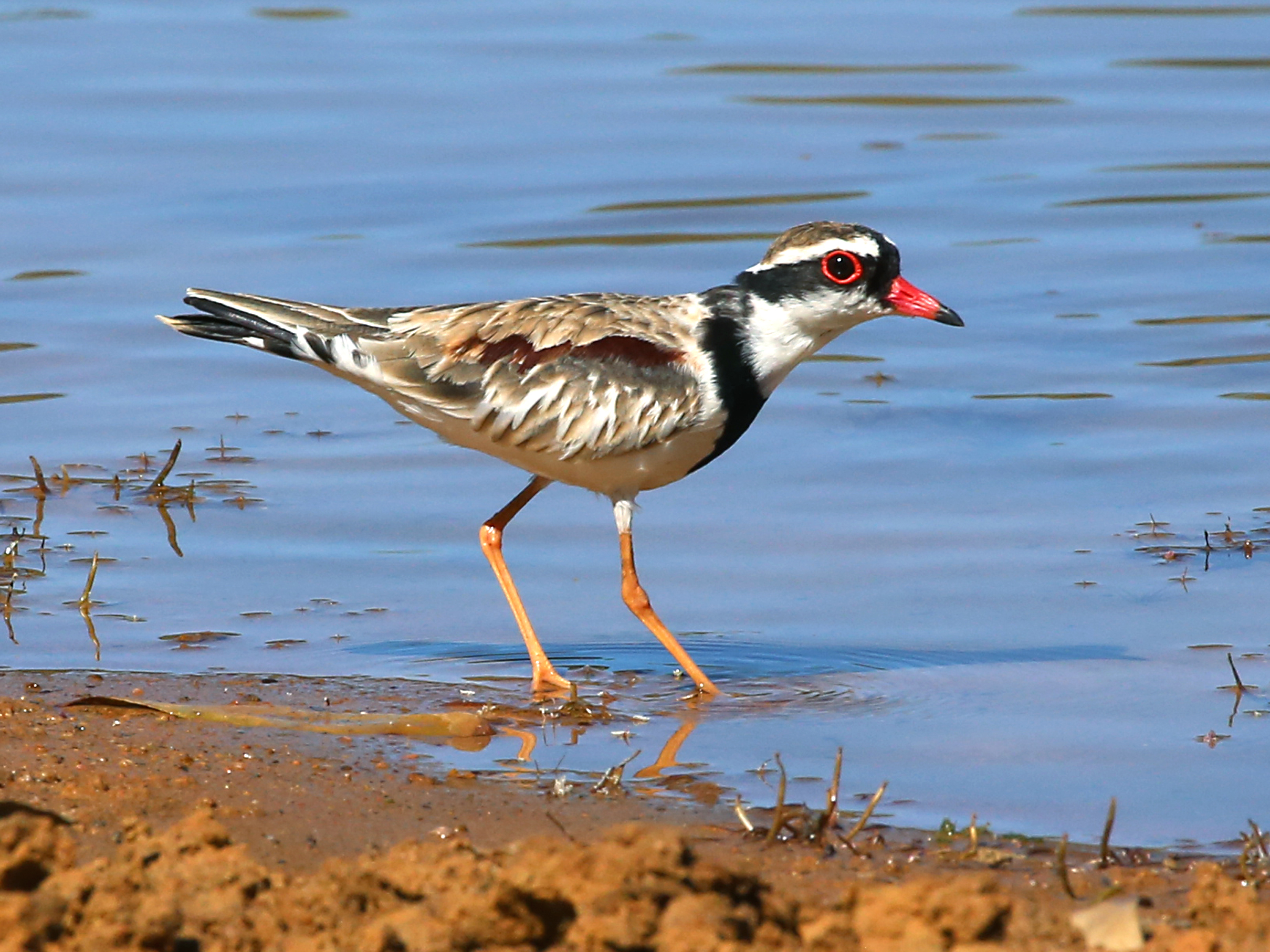
Atherton Tableland, Queensland, Australia

== Sources ==
- Marchant, S.; Higgins, P.J., eds. (1993). "Elseyornis melanops Black-fronted plover" (PDF). Handbook of Australian, New Zealand & Antarctic Birds. Vol. 2, Raptors to lapwings. Melbourne, Victoria: Oxford University Press. pp. 892–902. ISBN 978-0-19-553069-8. Archived (PDF) from the original on 28 January 2015.
- "Black-fronted dotterel | New Zealand Birds Online".
- Geering, A., Agnew, L. and Harding, S. 2007. Shorebirds of Australia. CSIRO Publishing. 9780643101340
- Menkhorst, P., Rogers, D., Clarke, R., Davies, J. and Marsack P. 2019. The Australian bird guide. Australia, CSIRO. 9781486311934
- Pizzey, G and Knight, F. 2012. Birds of Australia. Australia. HarperCollins Publishers. 9780732291938
- Reader's Digest. 1976. Reader's Digest completebook of Australian Birds. Sydney, Reader's Digest. 0909486409
- Rowland, P and Farrell, C. 2018. Australia's birdwatching megaspots. John Beaufoy Publishing p. 229. 9781912081660
