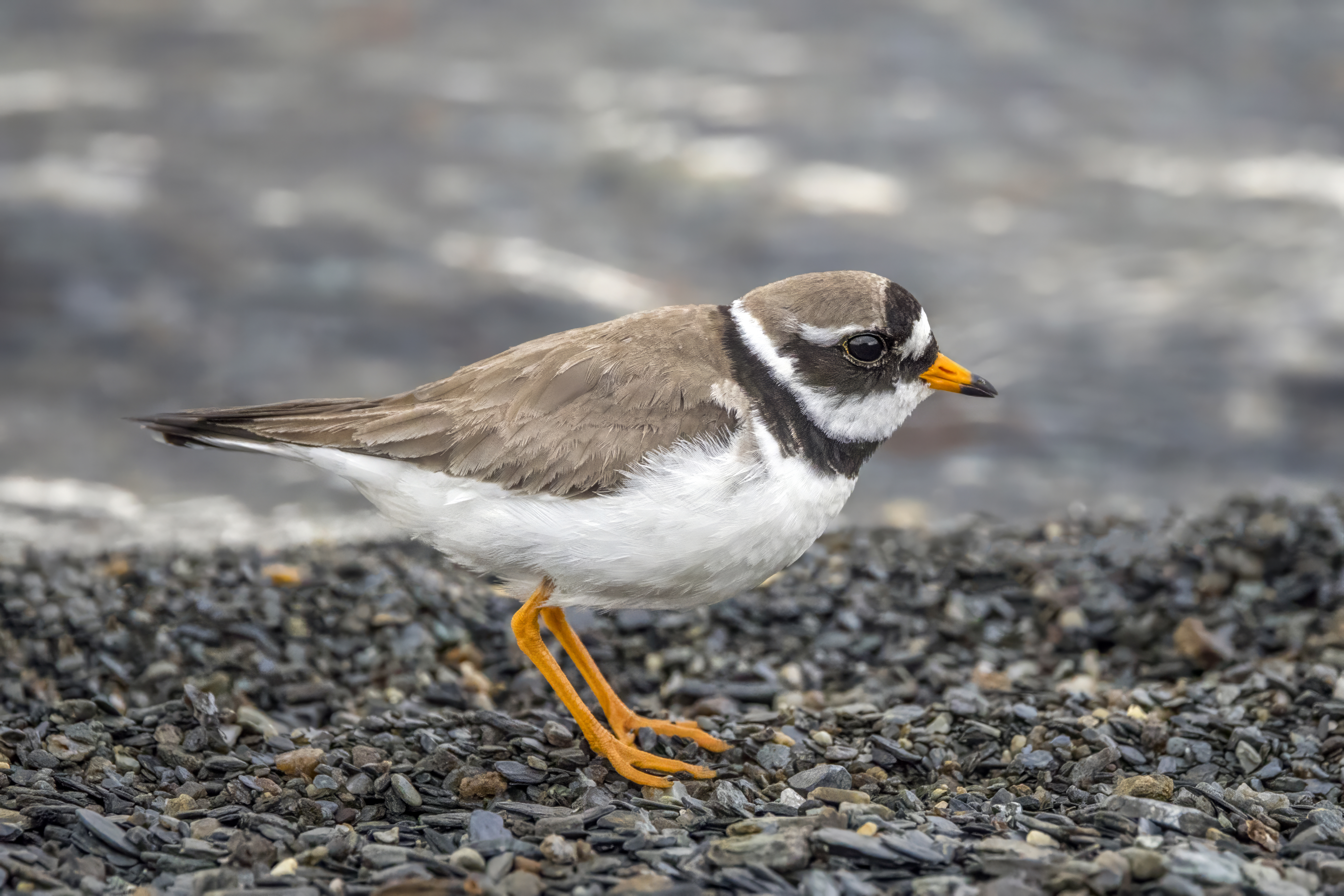
- Common ringed plover (Charadrius hiaticula), Norway

Scientific classification
- Kingdom: Animalia
- Phylum: Chordata
- Class: Aves
- Order: Charadriiformes
- Family: Charadriidae
- Subfamily: Charadriinae; Leach, 1820

Genera
- See table

= Plover =

Plovers

Family of birds

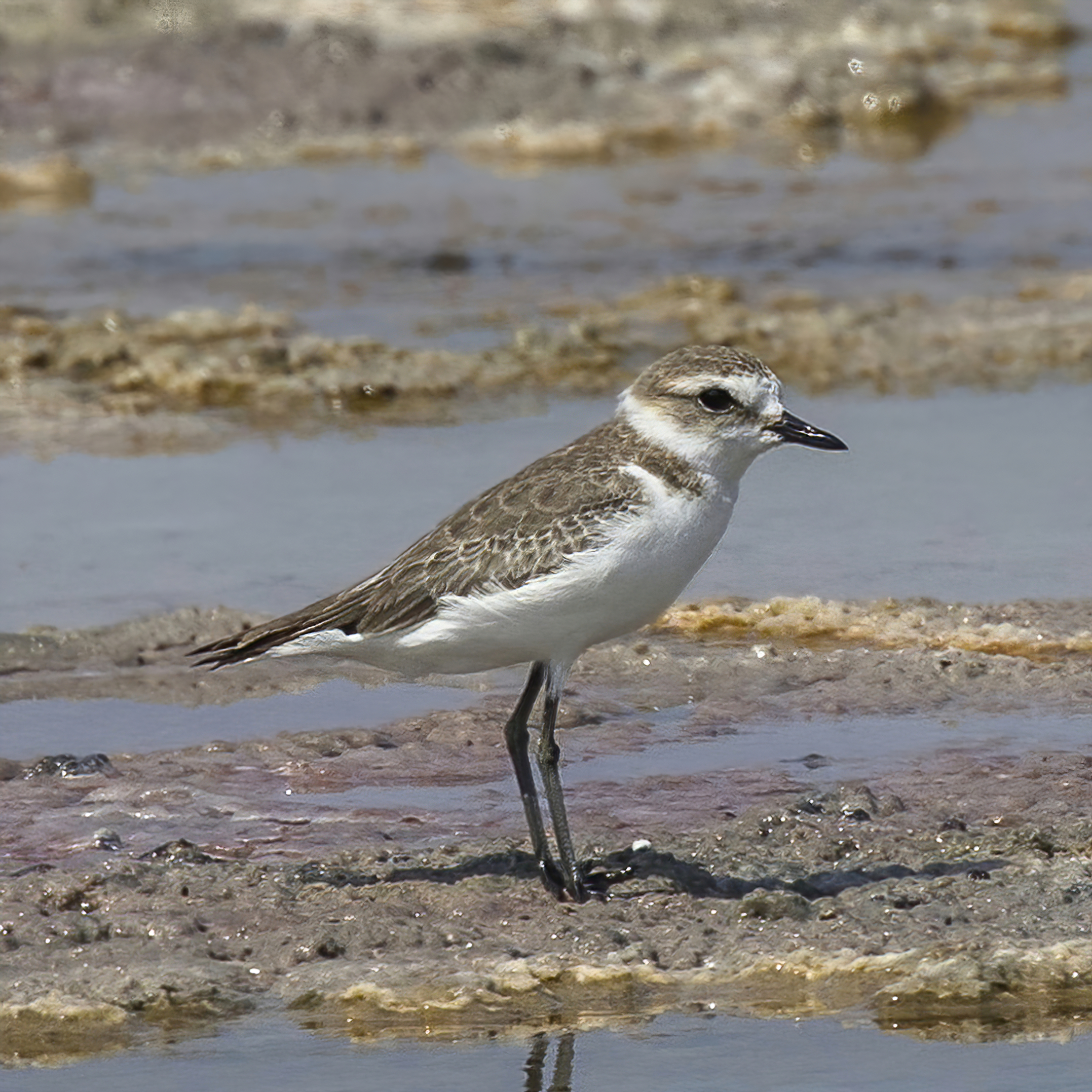
Kentish plover, Cyprus

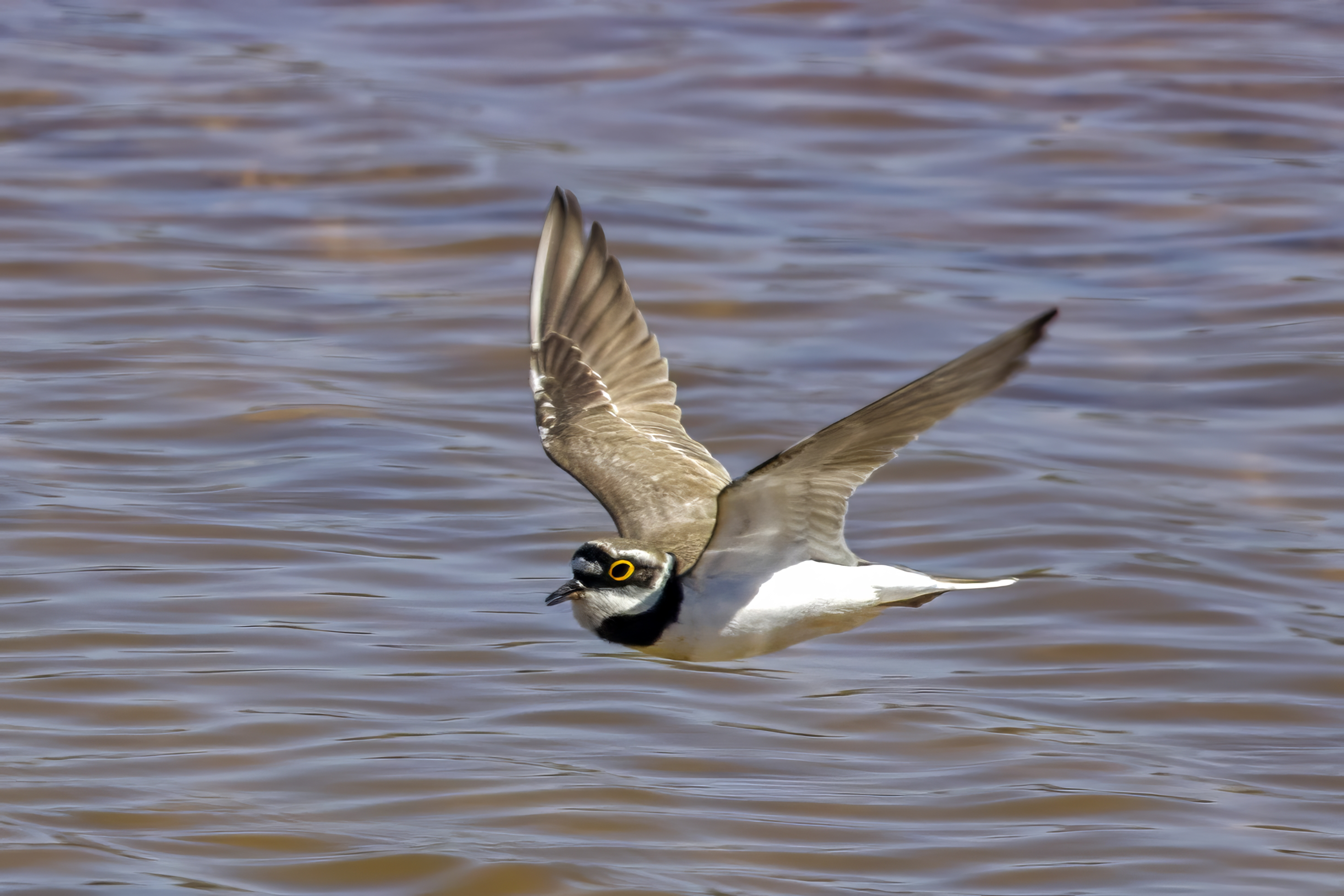
Little ringed plover, Norway

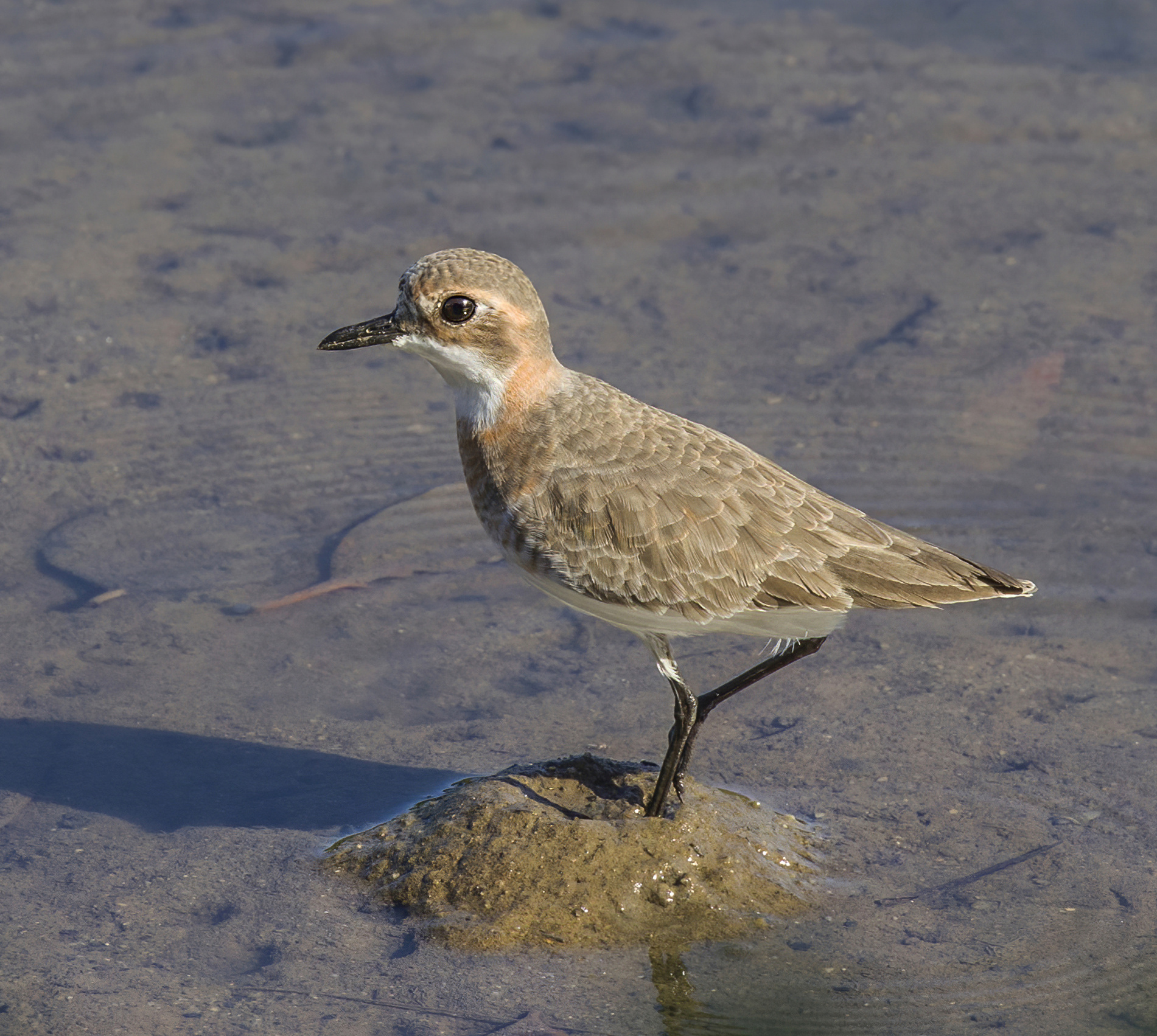
Greater sand plover, Thailand

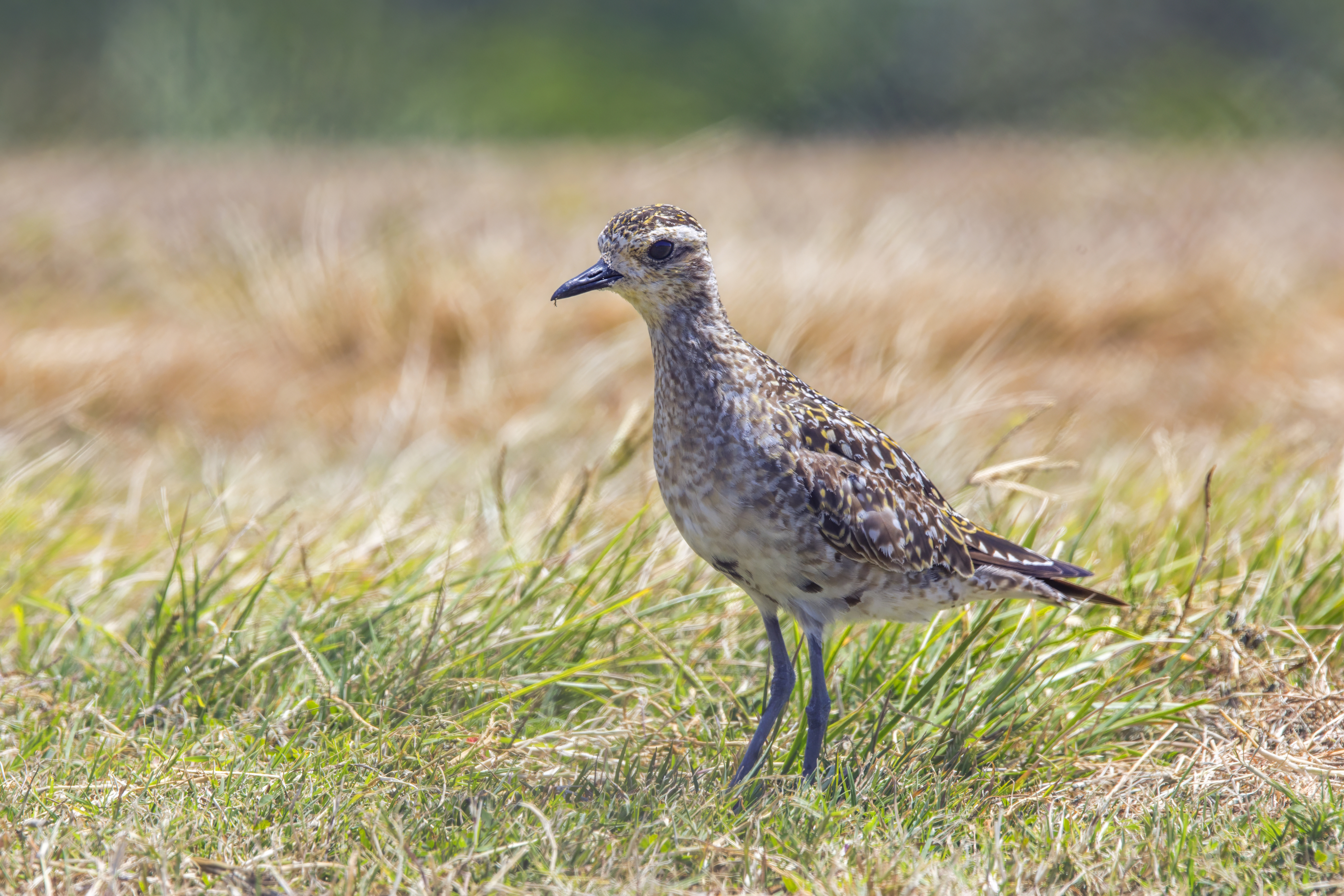
Pacific golden plover, Cook Islands

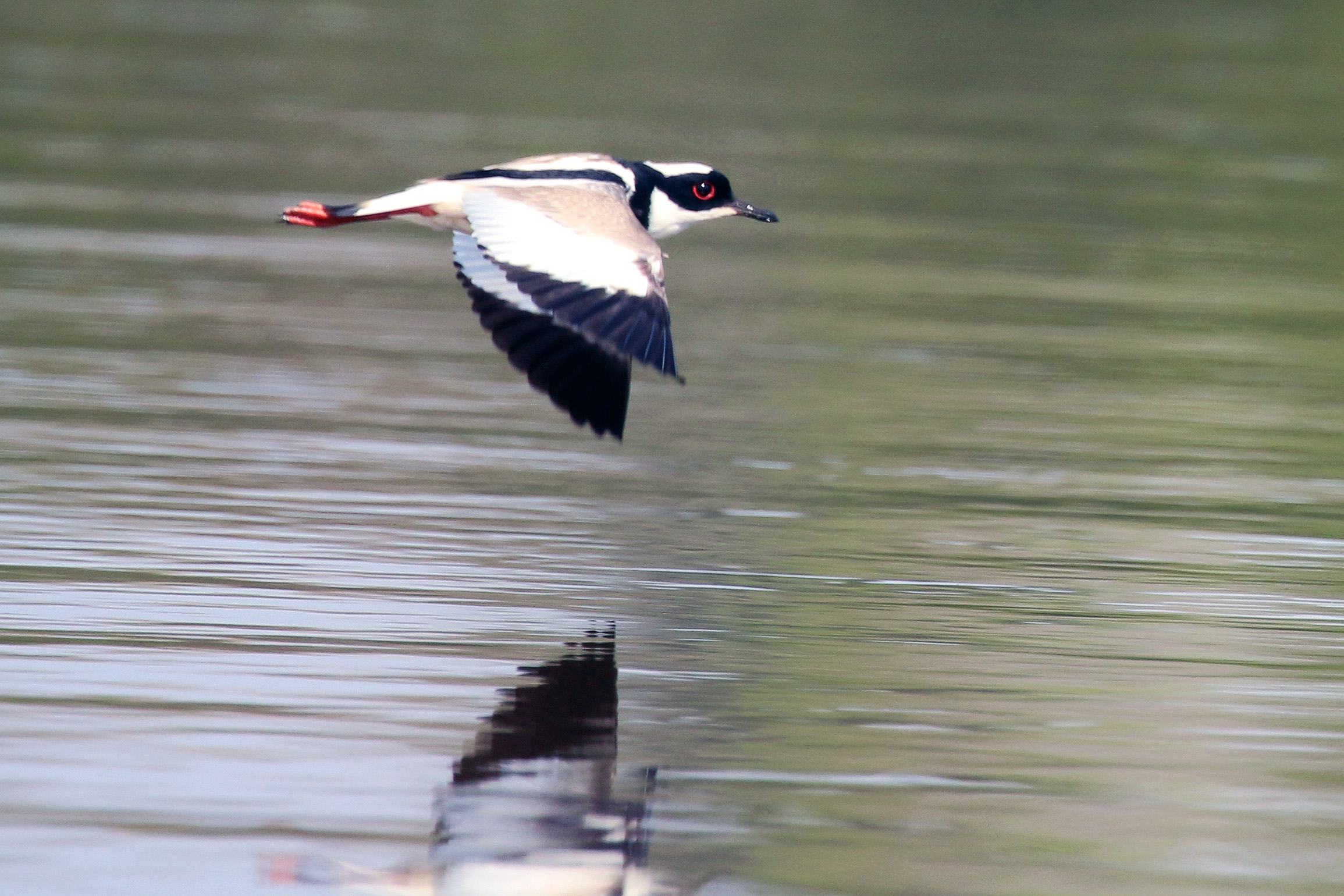
Pied plover, Brazil

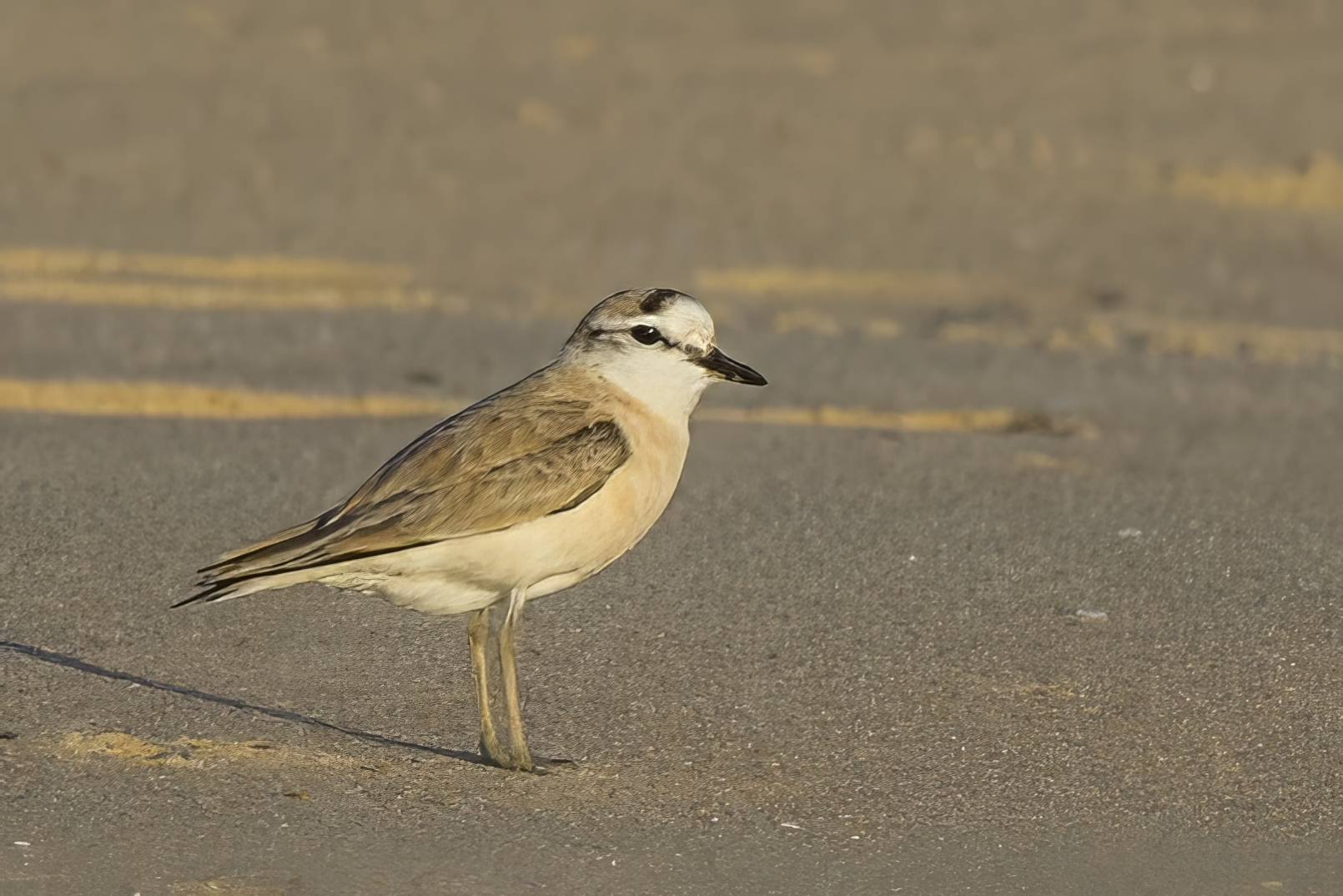
White-fronted plover, Mozambique

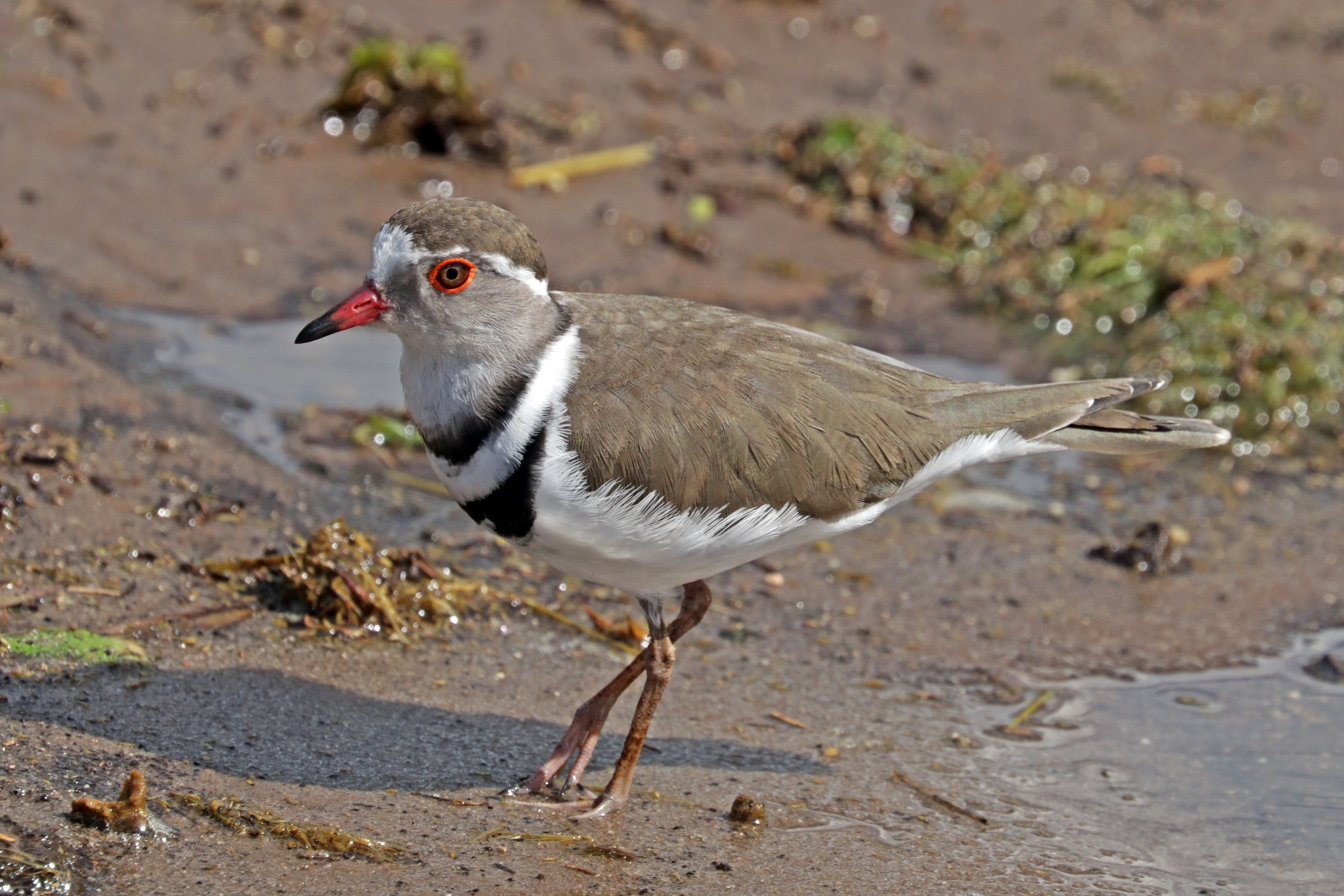
Three-banded plover, Botswana

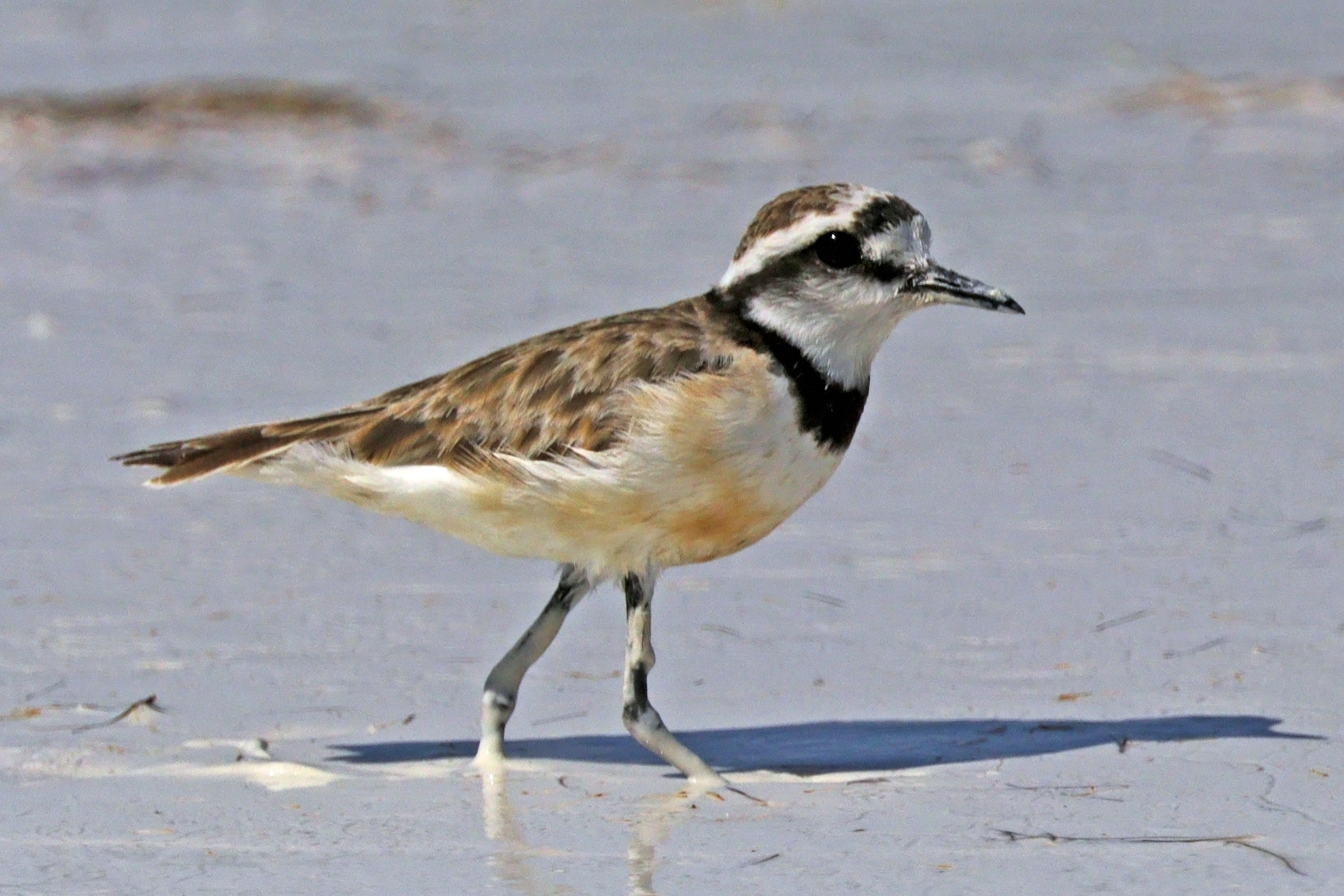
Madagascar plover, Madagascar

Plovers (/ˈplʌvər/ PLUV-ər, also US: /ˈploʊvər/ PLOE-vər) are members of a widely distributed group of wading birds of the family Charadriidae. The term "plover" applies to all the members of the family, though only about half of them include it in their name.

== Species list in taxonomic sequence ==
The taxonomy of family Charadriidae is unsettled. At various times the plovers, dotterels, and lapwings of family Charadriidae have been distributed among several subfamilies, with Charadriinae including most of the species. The International Ornithological Congress (IOC) and the Clements taxonomy do not assign species to subfamilies. The South American Classification Committee of the American Ornithological Society (AOS) includes all of the species in Charadriinae. The North American Classification Committee of the AOS and BirdLife International's Handbook of the Birds of the World separate the four members of genus Pluvialis as subfamily Pluvialinae. In the past, the lapwings in the genus Vanellus were widely treated in a further subfamily Vanellinae, but this was subsequently found to leave the Charadriinae paraphyletic, with the genus Anarhynchus, mostly long included within Charadrius, being more closely related to Vanellus than it is to Charadrius, despite the close plumage and structural similarities between Anarhynchus and Charadrius.

The IOC accepts the following 69 species of plovers, dotterels, and lapwings in the family Charadriidae. They are distributed among 11 genera, some of which have only one species. This list is presented according to the IOC taxonomic sequence and can also be sorted alphabetically by common name and binomial.

Common name	Binomial name + authority	IOC sequence
Grey plover	Pluvialis squatarola (Linnaeus, 1758)	1
European golden plover	Pluvialis apricaria (Linnaeus, 1758)	2
Pacific golden plover	Pluvialis fulva (Gmelin, JF, 1789)	3
American golden plover	Pluvialis dominica (Müller, PLS, 1776)	4
Tawny-throated dotterel	Oreopholus ruficollis (Wagler, 1829)	5
Rufous-chested dotterel	Zonibyx modestus Lichtenstein, MHC, 1823	6
Diademed sandpiper-plover	Phegornis mitchellii (Fraser, 1845)	7
Eurasian dotterel	Eudromias morinellus Linnaeus, 1758	8
Killdeer	Charadrius vociferus Linnaeus, 1758	9
Common ringed plover	Charadrius hiaticula Linnaeus, 1758	10
Semipalmated plover	Charadrius semipalmatus Bonaparte, 1825	11
Piping plover	Charadrius melodus Ord, 1824	12
Hooded dotterel	Charadrius cucullatus (Vieillot, 1818)	13
Forbes's plover	Charadrius forbesi (Shelley, 1883)	14
Three-banded plover	Charadrius tricollaris Vieillot, 1818	15
Black-fronted dotterel	Charadrius melanops (Vieillot, 1818)	16
Shore plover	Charadrius novaeseelandiae (Gmelin, JF, 1789)	17
Little ringed plover	Charadrius dubius Scopoli, 1786	18
Long-billed plover	Charadrius placidus Gray, JE & Gray, GR, 1863	19
Pied plover	Hoploxypterus cayanus (Latham, 1790)	20
Northern lapwing	Vanellus vanellus (Linnaeus, 1758)	21
Long-toed lapwing	Vanellus crassirostris (Hartlaub, 1855)	22
Blacksmith lapwing	Vanellus armatus (Burchell, 1822)	23
Spur-winged lapwing	Vanellus spinosus (Linnaeus, 1758)	24
River lapwing	Vanellus duvaucelii (Lesson, RP, 1826)	25
Yellow-wattled lapwing	Vanellus malabaricus (Boddaert, 1783)	26
Black-headed lapwing	Vanellus tectus (Boddaert, 1783)	27
White-crowned lapwing	Vanellus albiceps Gould, 1834	28
Senegal lapwing	Vanellus lugubris (Lesson, RP, 1826)	29
Black-winged lapwing	Vanellus melanopterus (Cretzschmar, 1829)	30
Crowned lapwing	Vanellus coronatus (Boddaert, 1783)	31
African wattled lapwing	Vanellus senegallus (Linnaeus, 1766)	32
Spot-breasted lapwing	Vanellus melanocephalus (Rüppell, 1845)	33
Brown-chested lapwing	Vanellus superciliosus (Reichenow, 1886)	34
Grey-headed lapwing	Vanellus cinereus (Blyth, 1842)	35
Red-wattled lapwing	Vanellus indicus (Boddaert, 1783)	36
Javan lapwing	Vanellus macropterus (Wagler, 1827)	37
Banded lapwing	Vanellus tricolor (Vieillot, 1818)	38
Masked lapwing	Vanellus miles (Boddaert, 1783)	39
Sociable lapwing	Vanellus gregarius (Pallas, 1771)	40
White-tailed lapwing	Vanellus leucurus (Lichtenstein, MHC, 1823)	41
Southern lapwing	Vanellus chilensis (Molina, 1782)	42
Andean lapwing	Vanellus resplendens (Tschudi, 1843)	43
Red-kneed dotterel	Erythrogonys cinctus Gould, 1838	44
Inland dotterel	Peltohyas australis (Gould, 1841)	45
Caspian plover	Anarhynchus asiaticus Pallas, 1773	46
Oriental plover	Anarhynchus veredus Gould, 1848	47
Tibetan sand plover	Anarhynchus atrifons (Wagler, 1829)	48
Siberian sand plover	Anarhynchus mongolus Pallas, 1776	49
Greater sand plover	Anarhynchus leschenaultii Lesson, RP, 1826	50
Double-banded plover	Anarhynchus bicinctus Jardine & Selby, 1827	51
Wrybill	Anarhynchus frontalis Quoy & Gaimard, 1832	52
New Zealand plover	Anarhynchus obscurus Gmelin, JF, 1789	53
Wilson's plover	Anarhynchus wilsonia Ord, 1814	54
Collared plover	Anarhynchus collaris Vieillot, 1818	55
Mountain plover	Anarhynchus montanus Townsend, JK, 1837	56
Puna plover	Anarhynchus alticola (Berlepsch & Stolzmann, 1902)	57
Two-banded plover	Anarhynchus falklandicus Latham, 1790	58
Madagascar plover	Anarhynchus thoracicus (Richmond, 1896)	59
Kittlitz's plover	Anarhynchus pecuarius Temminck, 1823	60
St. Helena plover	Anarhynchus sanctaehelenae (Harting, 1873)	61
Red-capped plover	Anarhynchus ruficapillus Temminck, 1821	62
Snowy plover	Anarhynchus nivosus (Cassin, 1858)	63
Chestnut-banded plover	Anarhynchus pallidus Strickland, 1853	64
Malaysian plover	Anarhynchus peronii Schlegel, 1865	65
White-fronted plover	Anarhynchus marginatus Vieillot, 1818	66
Javan plover	Anarhynchus javanicus Chasen, 1938	67
Kentish plover	Anarhynchus alexandrinus Linnaeus, 1758	68
White-faced plover	Anarhynchus dealbatus (Swinhoe, 1870)	69

== Description ==
Plovers are found throughout the world, with the exception of the driest parts of the Sahara Desert (where they may occur on migration) and Antarctica, and are small to medium-sized waders ranging from 12–38 cm (4.7–15.0 in) long, characterised by relatively short bills. They hunt by sight, rather than by feel as longer-billed waders like snipe do. They feed mainly on insects, worms or other invertebrates, depending on the habitat, which are obtained by a run-and-pause technique, rather than the steady probing of some other wader groups. Plovers engage in false brooding, a type of distraction display. Examples include pretending to change position or to sit on an imaginary nest site.

== Ecology ==
Many of the tropical and warm-temperate species are resident and individuals may spend their entire lives in a small territory on a single beach, but others, notably the Pluvialis species, and common ringed plover and semipalmated plover in Charadrius, are among the longest-distance migrant landbirds in the world. These breed on the Arctic Ocean coasts, and winter south to southernmost South America, South Africa, and New Zealand, with e.g. grey plovers breeding on the Arctic coast of Siberia migrating 14,000 km to South Africa.

== In folklore ==
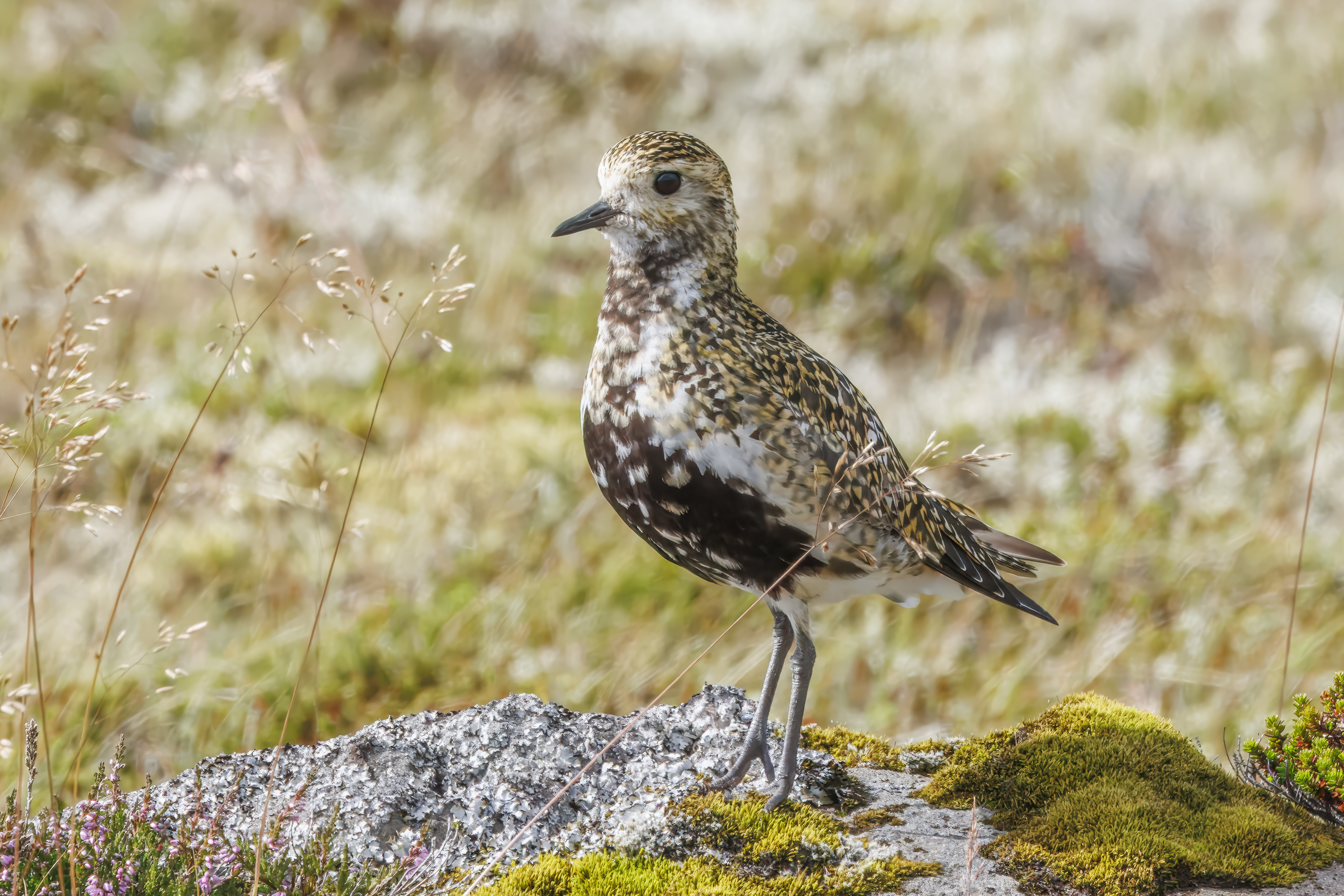
female European golden plover, Iceland

The European golden plover spends summers in Iceland, and in Icelandic folklore, the appearance of the first plover in the country means that spring has arrived. The Icelandic media always covers the first plover sighting.

== See also ==
- Egyptian plover
