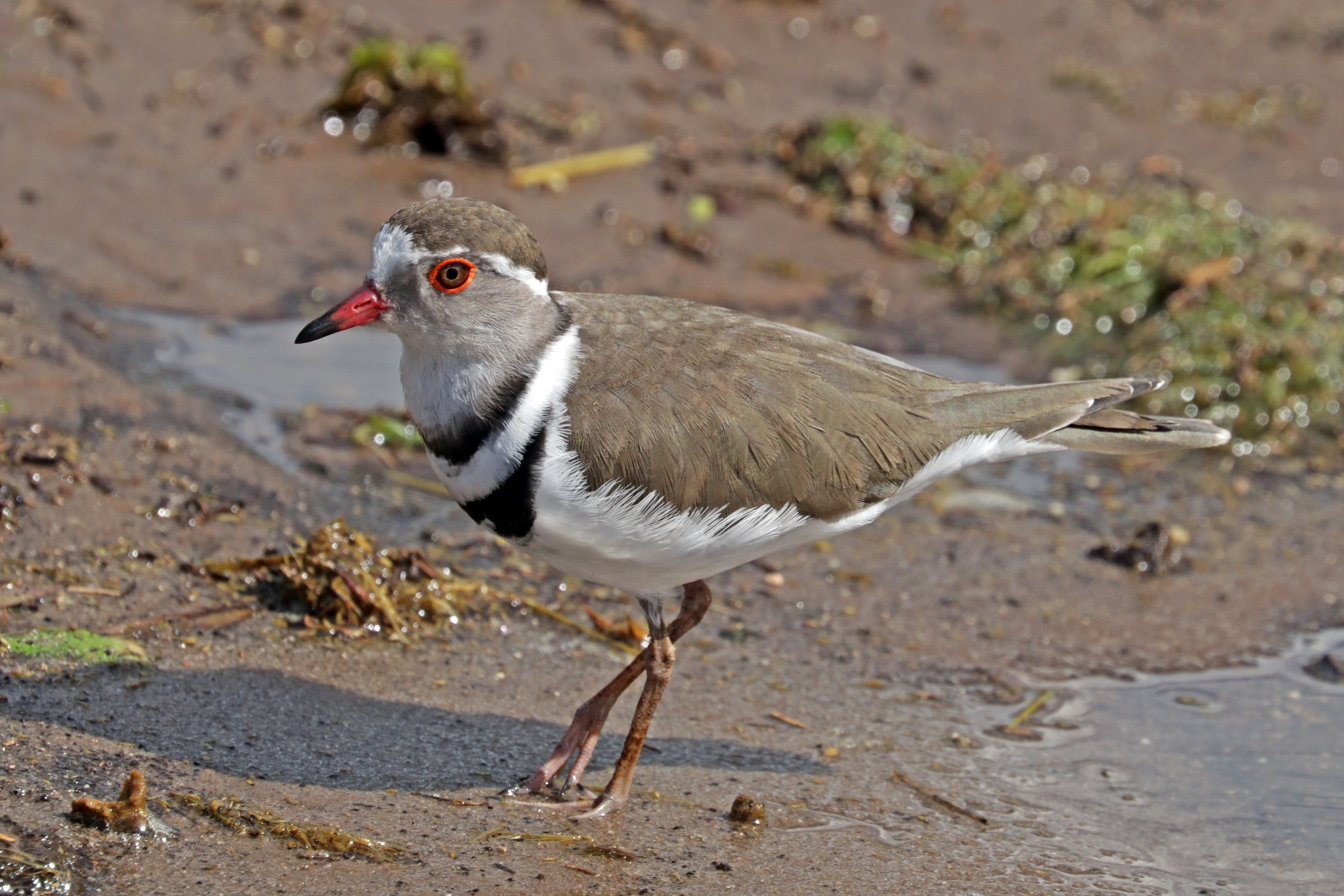
- Chobe National Park, Botswana

Conservation status
- Least Concern (IUCN 3.1)

Scientific classification
- Kingdom: Animalia
- Phylum: Chordata
- Class: Aves
- Order: Charadriiformes
- Family: Charadriidae
- Genus: Thinornis
- Species: T. tricollaris

Binomial name
- Thinornis tricollaris (Vieillot, 1818)

Synonyms
- Charadrius tricollaris

= Three-banded plover =

Species of bird

The three-banded plover, or three-banded sandplover (Charadrius tricollaris, syn.: Thinornis tricollaris), is a small wader. This plover is resident and generally sedentary in much of East Africa, southern Africa and Madagascar. It occurs mainly on inland rivers, pools, lakes and pans, frequenting their exposed shores. This species is often seen as single individuals, but it will form small flocks. It hunts by sight for insects, worms and other invertebrates. Three-banded plovers have a sharp whistled weeet-weet call. Its larger and darker-plumaged sister species, Forbes's plover, replaces it in West Africa and in the moist tropics. The two species have largely allopatric breeding ranges. Both species present a distinctively elongated profile, due to their proportionally long tail and wings.

== Description ==
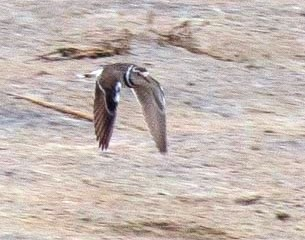
In flight, showing the white front and white side of the tail and rump. The long wings feature a thin white bar above, and a dark smudge over the primary coverts below.

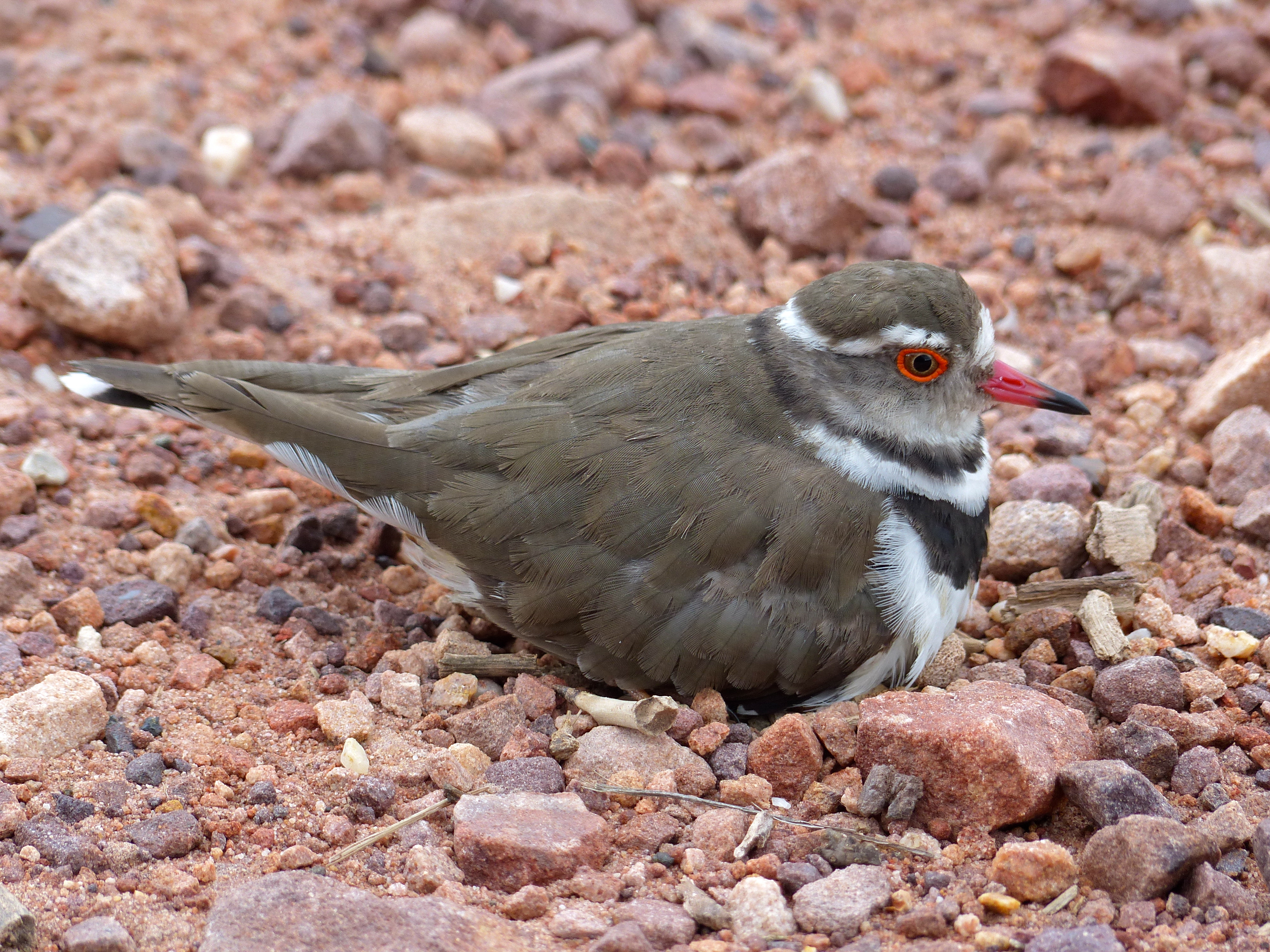
Female incubating

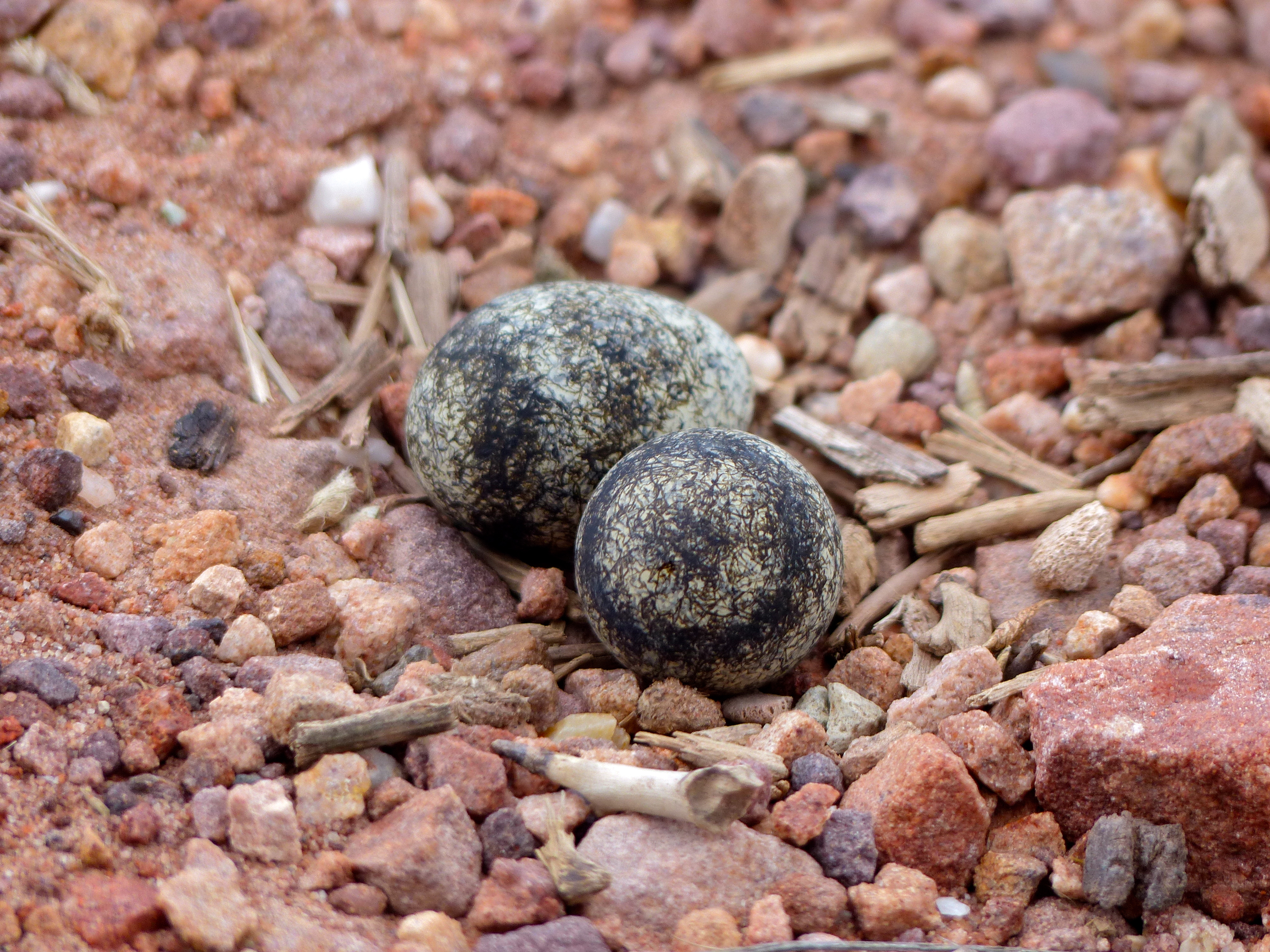
Nest with two eggs

The adult three-banded plover is 18 cm in length. It has long wings and a very long tail, and therefore looks different from most other small plovers in flight, the exception being the closely related Forbes's plover.

The adult three-banded plover has medium brown upperparts, and the underparts are white except for the two black breast bands, separated by a white band, which give this species its common and scientific names. The head is strikingly patterned, with a black crown, white supercilia extending from the white forehead to meet on the back of the neck, and a grey face becoming brown on the neck. The orbital ring is orange-red, and the base of the otherwise black bill is rosy red in colour.

The Malagasy subspecies C. t. bifrontatus has a grey band between the bill and the white forehead, and the sides of the head are grey. A genetic study reported genetic differentiation between Madagascar and the mainland population. The sexes are similar with respect to plumage and size. Juveniles of the nominate and Malagasy subspecies also resemble the adults, although the forehead is brownish for a short time, and the wing coverts show buff fringes. This species is distinguished from the larger and darker Forbes's plover in that the latter has a brown forehead and lacks a white wingbar.

== Breeding ==
Its nest is a bare scrape on shingle. Egg laying occurs from March to June in the tropics, but mainly (over 70%) from July to October (i.e. late winter to early spring) in southern Africa.
