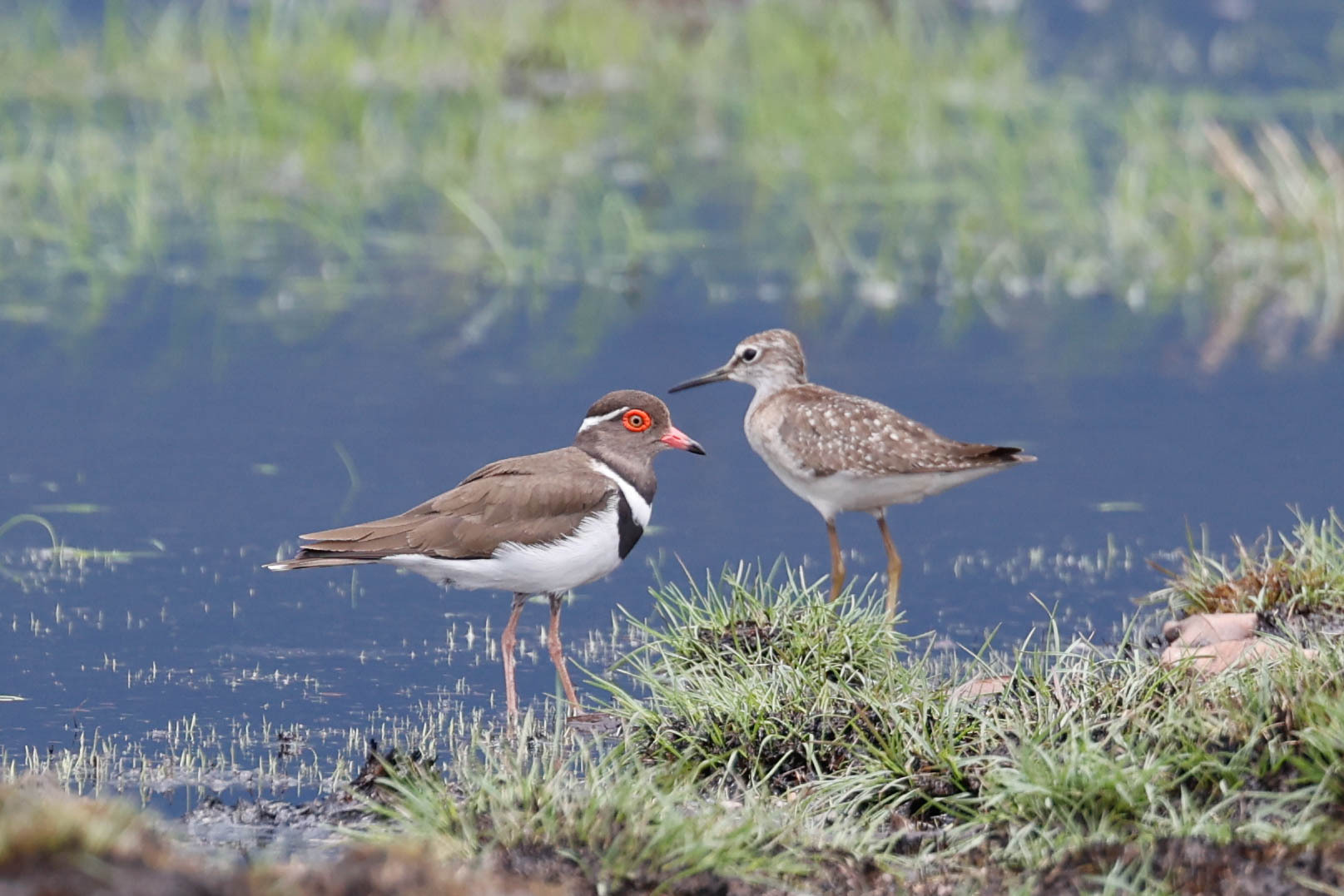
- Forbes's plover standing near a wood sandpiper (on the right)

Conservation status
- Least Concern (IUCN 3.1)

Scientific classification
- Kingdom: Animalia
- Phylum: Chordata
- Class: Aves
- Order: Charadriiformes
- Family: Charadriidae
- Genus: Thinornis
- Species: T. forbesi

Binomial name
- Thinornis forbesi (Shelley, 1883)

Synonyms
- Charadrius forbesi

= Forbes's plover =

Species of bird

Forbes's plover (Thinornis forbesi) or Forbes's banded plover is a small wader. This plover is resident in much of west Africa, mainly on inland rivers, pools and lakes. Its nest is a scrape lined with small pebbles in rocky uplands. After breeding in the wet season, this bird moves to open grasslands, including airfields and golf courses, in the dry season. It is sometimes seen at pools or reservoirs.

== Taxonomy ==
This species was named for the British zoologist William Alexander Forbes. The species is monotypic: no subspecies are recognised.

== Description ==
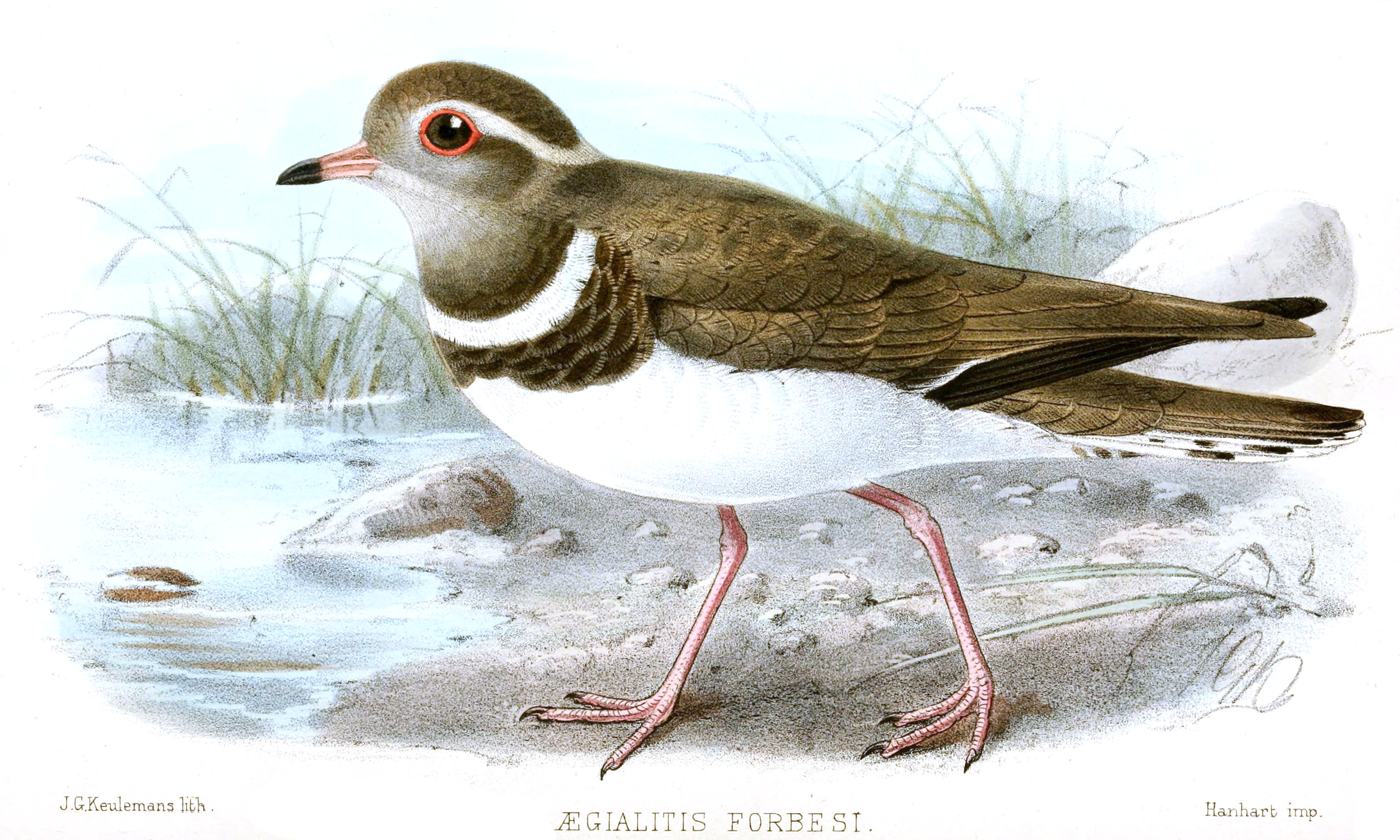
A painting of forbes's plover by J. G. Keulemans (1883)

The adult Forbes's plover is 20 cm in length. It has long wings and a long tail, and therefore looks different from most other small plovers in flight, the exception being the closely related three-banded plover which replaces it in eastern and southern Africa and Madagascar.

The breeding adult has dark brown upperparts, and the underparts are white except for the two black breast bands, separated by a white band, which give this species its common and scientific names. The head is strikingly patterned, with a black crown, brown forehead, white supercilia extending from above the eyes to meet on the back of the neck, and a grey face. The eye ring and the base of the otherwise black bill are red. The sexes are similar. In non-breeding adults, the breast bands may be dark brown, and the supercilia buff-tinged. Juveniles resemble the non-breeding adult, but are duller. This species is larger and darker than the three-banded plover. The latter species also has a white forehead and a white wingbar.

Forbes's plover is often seen as single individuals, but may form small flocks. It hunts by sight for insects, worms and other invertebrates. It has a piping peee-oo call.
