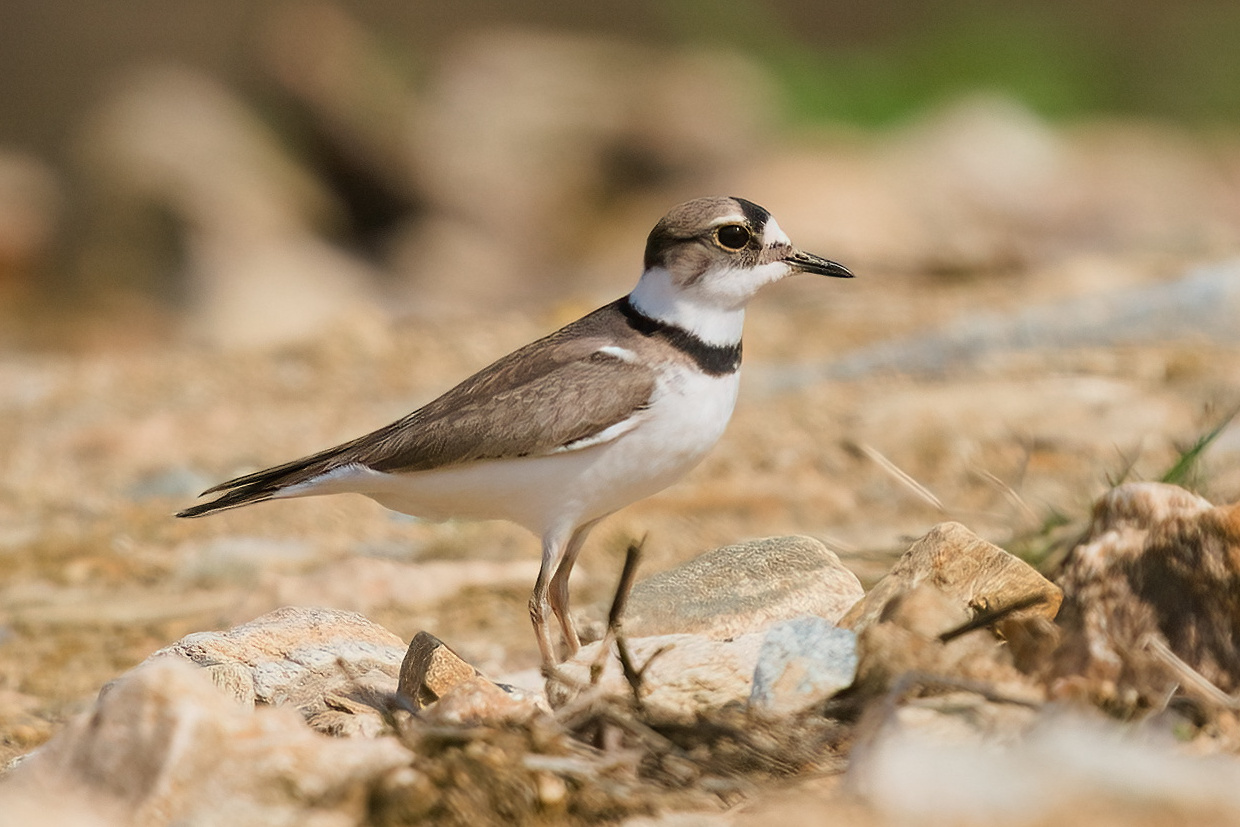
- Long-billed plover in Wuhan, Hubei Province, China

Conservation status
- Least Concern (IUCN 3.1)

Scientific classification
- Kingdom: Animalia
- Phylum: Chordata
- Class: Aves
- Order: Charadriiformes
- Family: Charadriidae
- Genus: Thinornis
- Species: T. placidus

Binomial name
- Thinornis placidus (Gray, JE & Gray, GR, 1863)

Synonyms
- Charadrius placidus

= Long-billed plover =

Species of bird

The long-billed plover (Thinornis placidus) is a species of wading bird in the family Charadriidae. It can be found in Bangladesh, Bhutan, Brunei, Cambodia, China, Hong Kong, India, Indonesia, Japan, Laos, Malaysia, Mongolia, Myanmar, Nepal, North Korea, Russia, South Korea, Sri Lanka, Taiwan, Thailand, and Vietnam. The long-billed plover is a migratory bird, so it breeds and spends the winter in different parts of its range. This bird can often be spotted along the shores of rivers, streams, in wetlands, and rice fields. It forages on the shoreline primarily for aquatic insects, insect larvae, and other invertebrates. It is difficult to distinguish between male and female individuals because of their similar plumage. The breeding season starts at the end of February or early March and ends in July. A male and a female forms a monogamous pair and maintains their territory throughout the breeding season. A global population survey in 2016 assessed the long-billed plover as a species of least concern on the International Union for Conservation of Nature (IUCN) Red List.

== Taxonomy ==
The long-billed plover is one of seven species of plovers placed in the genus Thinornis of the family Charadriidae that includes plovers, lapwings, and dotterels. Charadriidae is one of the 17 families under the order Charadriiformes that comprises a wide variety of shorebirds, such as gulls, terns, auks, puffins, sandpipers, lapwings, plovers, and allies. The long-billed plover was first described by J. E. Gray and G. R. Gray in 1863, and no subspecies are recognised.

== Description ==
=== Measurement and plumage ===
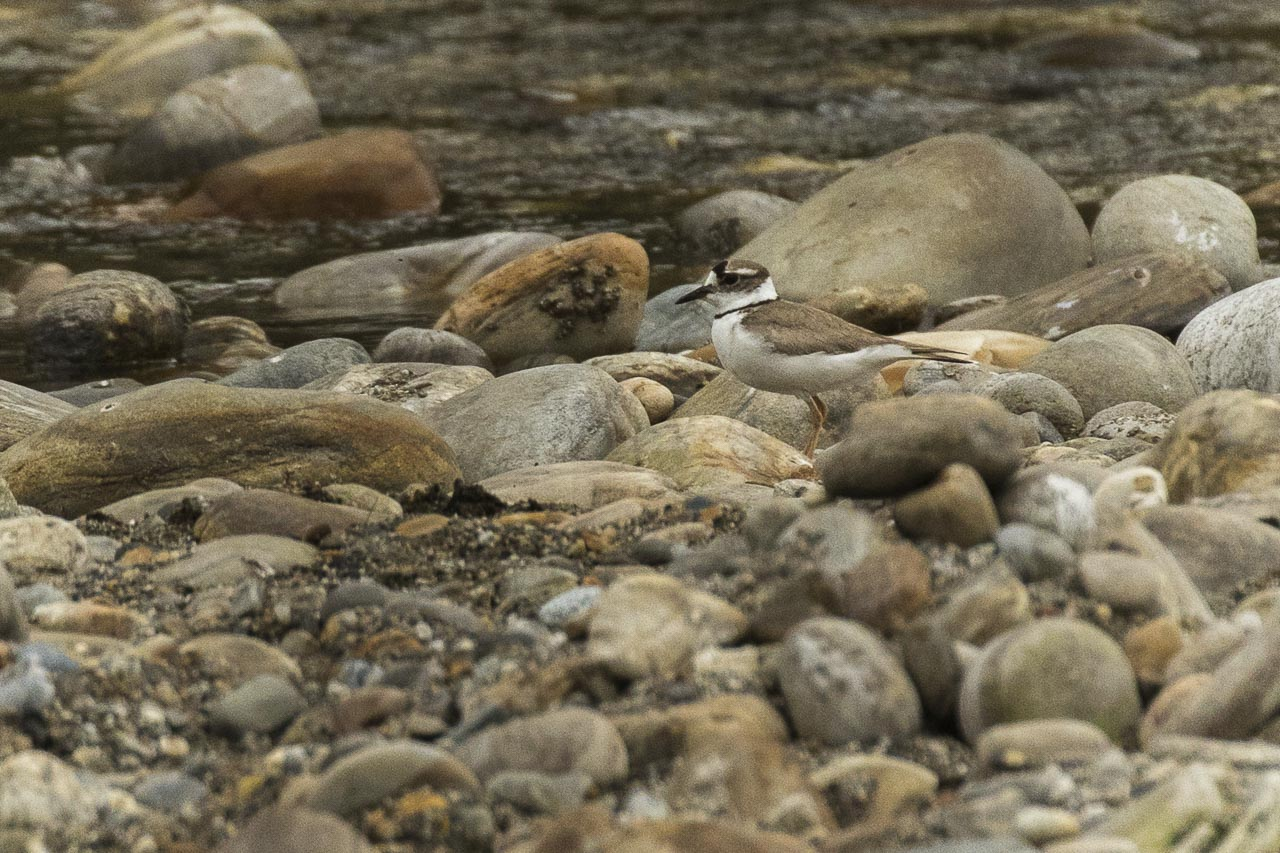
A long-billed plover with its adult plumage

The long-billed plover is a medium-sized wading bird about 19–20 centimetres (7.5–7.9 inches), and weighing around 41–70 grams (1.4–2.5 oz). The different body parts of males and females are similar in size. On average, the wing length is 14–15 centimetres (5.5–5.9 in), its tail length 7–8 centimetres (2.8–3.1 in), and the bill is about 2 centimetres (0.79 in) long. Both males and females have a grayish brown back and a white belly and throat. The forehead is white with a black band that runs from one eye to the other. The white patch of the forehead extends to the base of the bill. There is a black breast band below the throat. The eyes have a yellow ring around them, and a white stripe above. Even though the male and female have a similar appearance, their breeding plumage (summer plumage) has a few differences that can help distinguish between the two sexes. The black band on the forehead and on the breast of the male is wider and more distinct than that of the female. The feathers around the eyes of an adult breeding male are much darker than those of a female. Furthermore, the male's white eyestripe extends more distinctly behind the eye compared to that of the female. Juveniles look quite similar to adult individuals, however they lack the dark forehead band of adult birds. The breast band of juveniles is narrower and less distinct than that of adult males.

=== Confusion with other similar species ===
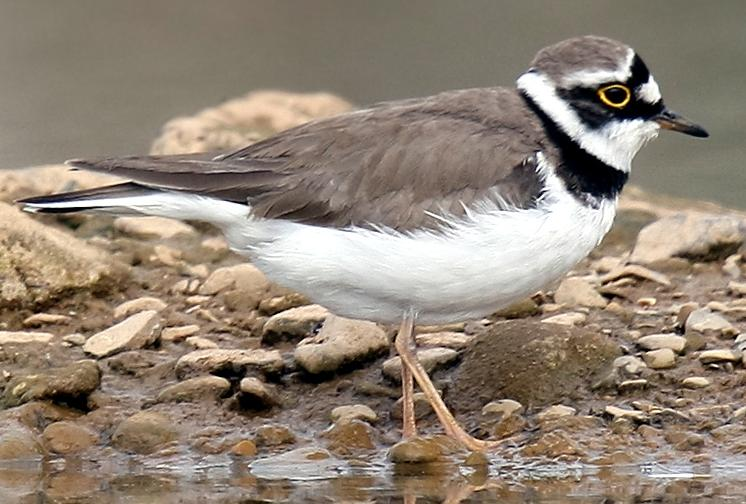
Adult male little-ringed plover with breeding plumage

The long-billed plover is often confused with other species of plover such as the little-ringed plover, because of range overlap and similarity in appearance. However, the two species can still be distinguished from each other. The long-billed plover is larger than the little-ringed plover. As the name suggests, the long-billed plover has a longer and thicker bill than the little-ringed plover. Adult breeding male individuals of little-ringed plover have a solid black bar above the base of the bill, in addition to the black forehead band. The feathers around the eyes of little-ringed plover are black unlike the brown cheek feathers of long-billed plover. Furthermore, the yellow eye-ring of the little-ringed plover is much more distinct than that of long-billed plover. The breast band of the little-ringed plover is usually wider at the center than on the sides, whereas the breast band of long-billed plover has more or less uniform thickness.

== Distribution and habitat ==
The long-billed plover is widely distributed throughout South and East Asia. It is quite uncommon throughout its range and occurs in small numbers. Breeding ground generally includes western, northern, and central parts of China, Japan, North Korea, and South Korea. Many instances of breeding activity have been reported in the Bureya river and other parts of far east Russia, Honshu island in Japan, southeastern China, and in the western Arunachal Pradesh in India near the Himalayas. This species has also been spotted during its breeding season in Singapore. The long-billed plover travels south of its breeding range to spend the winter. It generally winters throughout eastern Nepal, northeast India to Indochina, southern China, South Korea, Honshu, Shikoku, and Kiyushu islands of Japan, Taiwan, Myanmar, Malaysia, and Thailand. Populations on the three main islands of Japan do not generally migrate south, and are year-round residents. Only the population in Hokkaido travel south to winter in warmer climates.

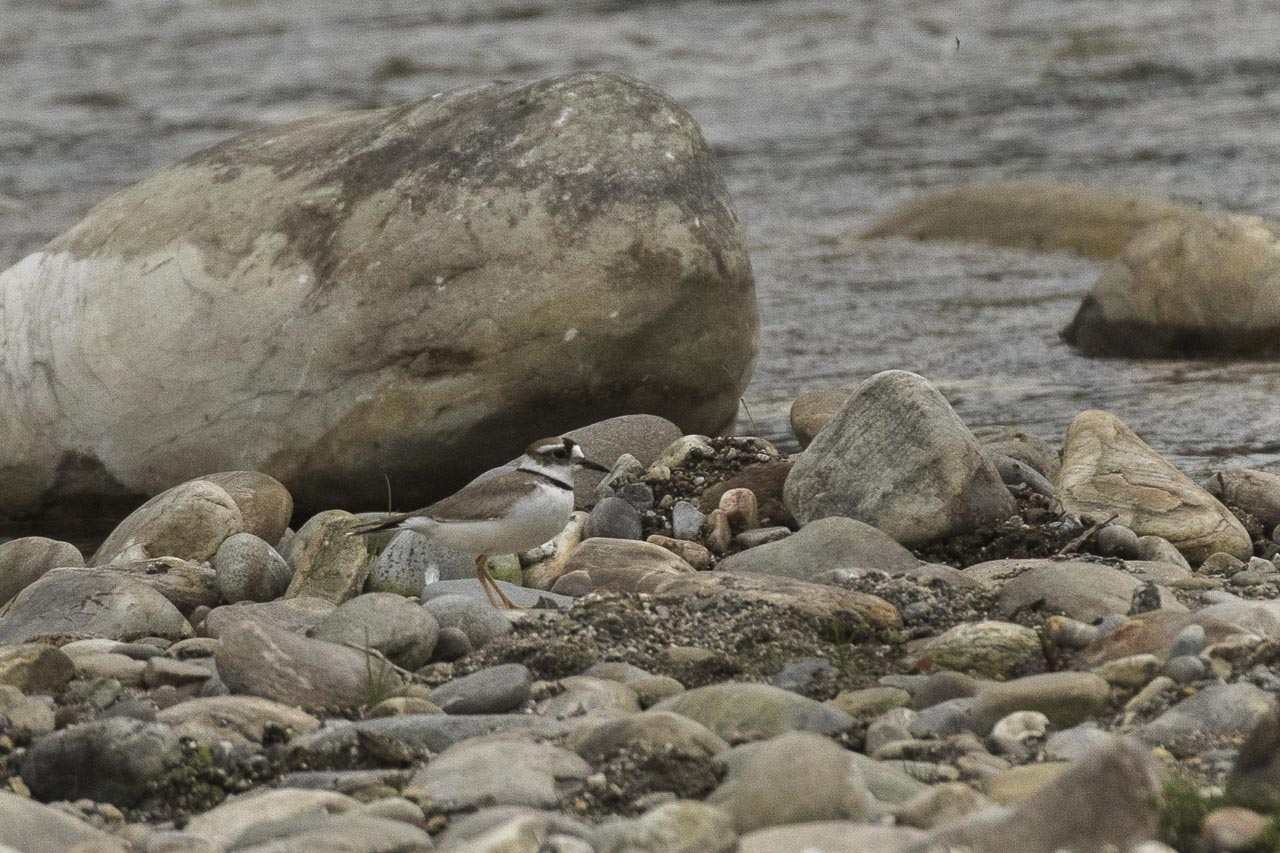
Long-billed plover in its ideal habitat

Long-billed plovers prefer to inhabit the shores of rivers, streams, and lakes with small, round pebbles and rocks. They tend to nest on small temporary shingle islands or pebble spits that form between the different branches of meandering mountain rivers. These islands cannot be prone to frequent flooding, and need to be at least 600 square metres (6,500 ft^{2}) in area. The islands also need to have large patches of stones and pebbles that are 30–60 millimetres (1.2–2.4 in) in size. Their habitats are often surrounded by shrubs, willows, and young forests. Long-billed plovers can also be found in freshwater wetland habitats and rice fields in the winter. These birds tend to avoid sandy beaches, mudflats, and areas with large boulders.

== Behavior ==
=== Vocalization ===
The long-billed plover has a wide variety of calls for different situations. They tend to get highly vocal during the breeding season. They can be seen flapping their wings rapidly, flying over their territories, and emitting a "fi-fi-fi-fi-fi" call. Males sometimes make a quiet "gee gee" call when they expand their chest to intimidate other rival males. When they are vigilant, they make a single rising "pyuoo-" call. When they are sheltering themselves from a predator or any threat, they emit a call like, "pip-pip-pip".

=== Food and feeding ===
Very little information is available on the feeding habit of the long-billed plover. Its diet is thought to primarily include aquatic insects and other invertebrates. These birds have been observed to prey on midges, dragonflies, larvae of beetles, flies, and earthworms. Long-billed plovers forage along the shoreline and when they spot a prey, they move towards it quickly and capture it with their long bill. They do not seem to consume any plant material.

Similar species in the genus Charadrius such as the common ringed plover and the Kentish plover have been observed to prey on mysid shrimps. The diet of long-billed plovers may also consist of similar crustaceans.

=== Breeding ===
Long-billed plovers exhibit a monogamous breeding system in which a male and a female form a pair and establish a territory that they maintain. Females, however, can abandon their nests sometimes to breed with other males. Males generally do not leave their territories. Both males and females take part in territorial disputes. They fly around their territory and let out loud calls. They puff their chest, and often jump, and peck to ward off any unwelcoming intruder. Males begin their breeding activity towards the end of February or in early March. The male displaces gravel with its feet and makes a shallow pit or depression, about 4 centimetres (1.6 in) deep and 13 centimetres (5.1 in) in diameter, by pressing its chest against the ground. The male attracts a female by calling her. When a female comes to the nest, the male spreads his tail for courtship display. The female passes under the tail of the male and enters the nest. The male makes many of these pits on the ground and guides the female from one pit to another, and the female eventually lays eggs in one of nests. The female lays one egg every 48 hours until she has a clutch of four eggs. The diameter and length of an egg is typically around 3.5 and 2.6 centimetres (1.4 and 1.0 in) respectively. The eggs generally weigh around 10–13 grams (0.35–0.46 oz). The eggs are pear-shaped, and they are grayish brown or bluish gray in color with tiny brown spots. Both male and female take part in nest maintenance. They line their nest with small pebbles, twigs, small pieces of bark, and other dry plant parts. Both male and female also carry out incubation of eggs. Eggs normally hatch 29 days after the start of incubation. Incubation period can vary because of human disturbance. Long-billed plovers show a decent amount of parental care. If a predator approaches a nest, the parents try to intimidate the enemy and chase it away by making loud distress calls. Furthermore, on very hot summer days, the parents protect the eggs from overheating by standing over them and shading them from the sun. Long-billed plovers give birth to precocial offspring, meaning that the hatchlings can move around and feed by themselves shortly after hatching. The parents constantly monitor the hatchlings and are always on the lookout for any signs of danger. The hatchlings gain body mass at the rate of 1 gram (0.035 oz) per day, and they become ready to fly when they are 40 days old. Fledglings remain together with their parents for a short time before they leave the nest and migrate to their wintering grounds.

Long-billed plovers tend to return to the same breeding for several consecutive years. This indicates that the same pairs occupy the same nesting sites every year. The pairs tend to be attracted to the same breeding sites year after year. They begin to establish territories when the area still remains covered with snow, suggesting that they must have previous knowledge of the suitability of the site.

== Conservation status ==
The long-billed plover is listed as a species of least concern on the IUCN Red List because of its wide distribution and large home range. It has a distribution range that exceeds 20,000 square kilometres (7,700 mi^{2}). The global population seems to be decreasing, but the rate of decline is not drastic enough to make this species vulnerable. Population decline has to be more than 30% over ten years or three generations for a species to be deemed vulnerable. Even though long-billed plovers are not vulnerable or threatened now, their population might decline rapidly in the future due to the loss of suitable breeding grounds. Conservation efforts should include protection and restoration of breeding habitats. Habitat restoration projects can provide new breeding habitats through the artificial construction of gravel banks and pebble islands.
