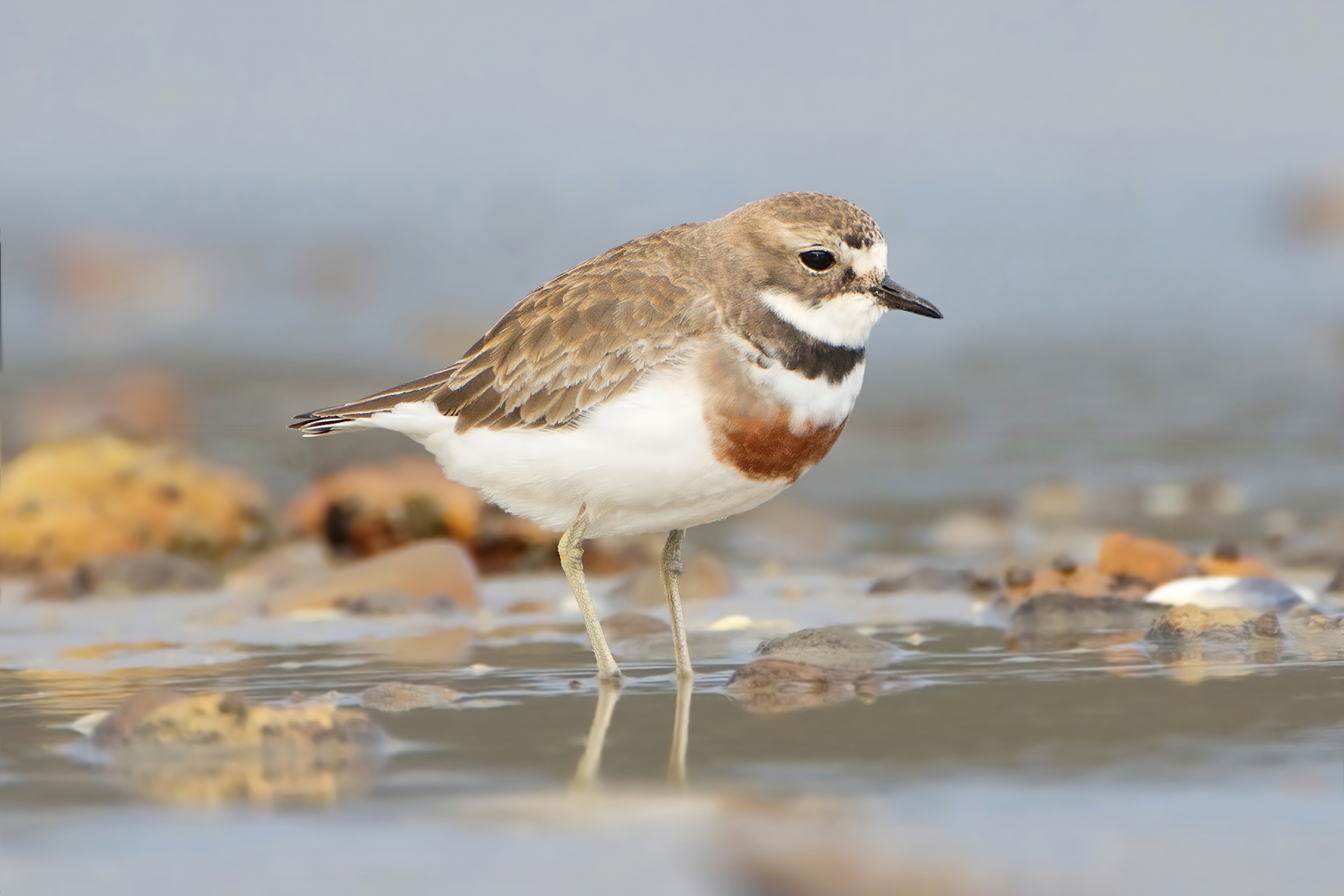
- Breeding plumage
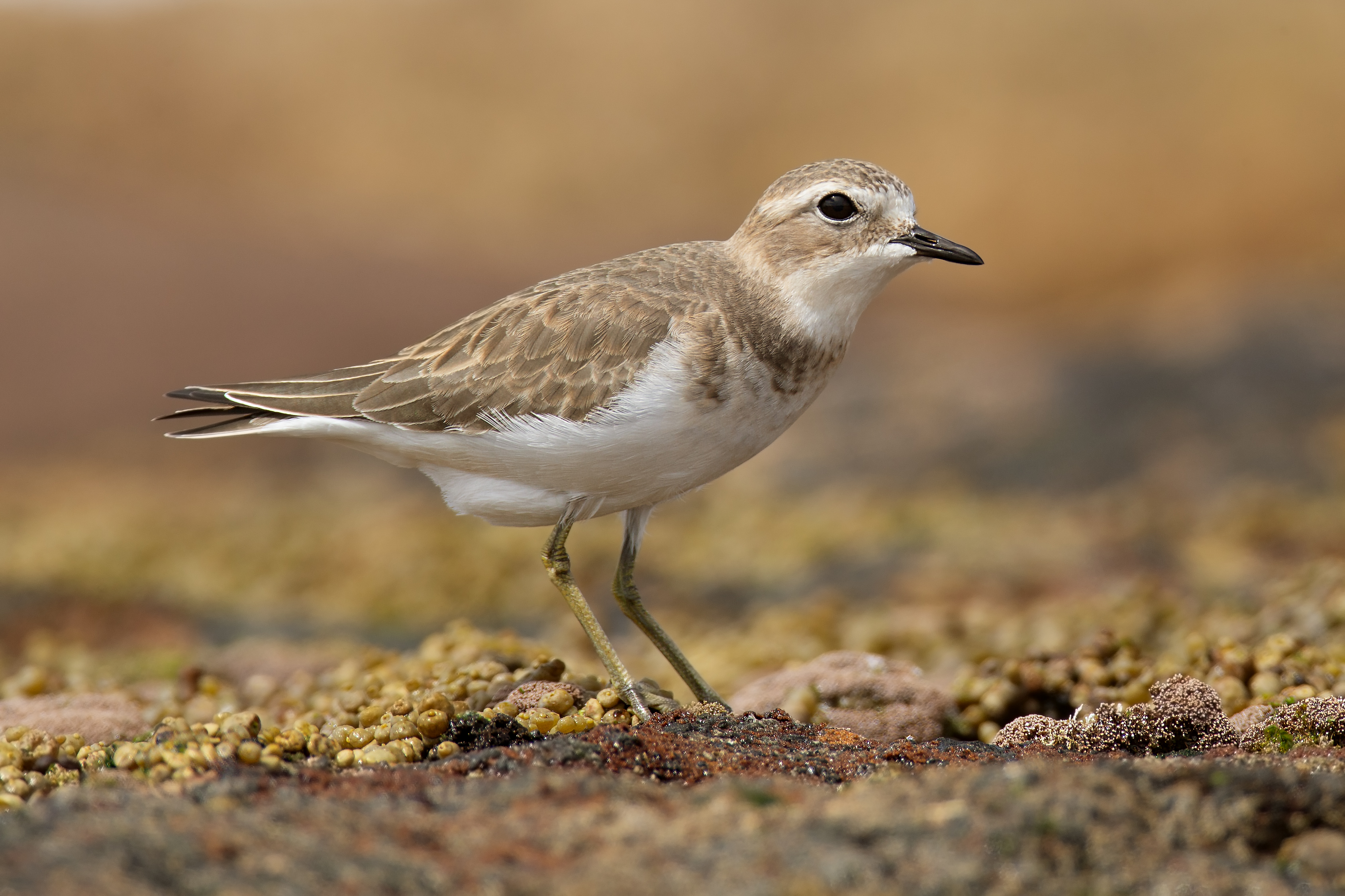
- Non-breeding plumage

Conservation status
- Near Threatened (IUCN 3.1)

Scientific classification
- Kingdom: Animalia
- Phylum: Chordata
- Class: Aves
- Order: Charadriiformes
- Family: Charadriidae
- Genus: Anarhynchus
- Species: A. bicinctus

Binomial name
- Anarhynchus bicinctus (Jardine & Selby, 1827)

Synonyms
- Charadrius bicinctus (protonym)

= Double-banded plover =

Species of bird

The double-banded plover (Anarhynchus bicinctus), known as the banded dotterel or pohowera in New Zealand, is a species of bird in the plover family. Two subspecies are recognised: the nominate Anarhynchus bicinctus bicinctus, which breeds throughout New Zealand, including the Chatham Islands, and A. b. exilis, which breeds in New Zealand's subantarctic Auckland Islands.

== Taxonomy ==
A 2015 study by Phylogenetics and Evolution found its closest relatives to be two other plovers found in New Zealand, the New Zealand dotterel (A. obscurus, also called the New Zealand plover) and the wrybill (A. frontalis, which the study found to be in the Charadrius clade).

== Description ==
The double-banded plover is distinguished by a dark, grey-brown back with a distinctive white chest and a thin band of black situated just below the neck running across the chest along with a larger brown band underneath. During breeding season, these bands are more dominantly shown on the males compared to females. Younger birds have no bands, and are often speckled brown on top, with less white parts. These shorebirds have relatively long legs to allow them to easily wade around shallow waters and move efficiently around sandy beaches. Their long pointed wings aid in traveling long distances as they allow the bird to be very agile. The double-banded plover's head is prominent with large, dark-brown eyes and a sturdy black bill. Due to similar colors within the plovers ideal habitat, spotting these birds can be difficult to achieve, however the "chirp-chirp" call is easily heard and their habit of running quickly then pausing to feed on food can catch the eye of observers.

== Distribution and habitat ==
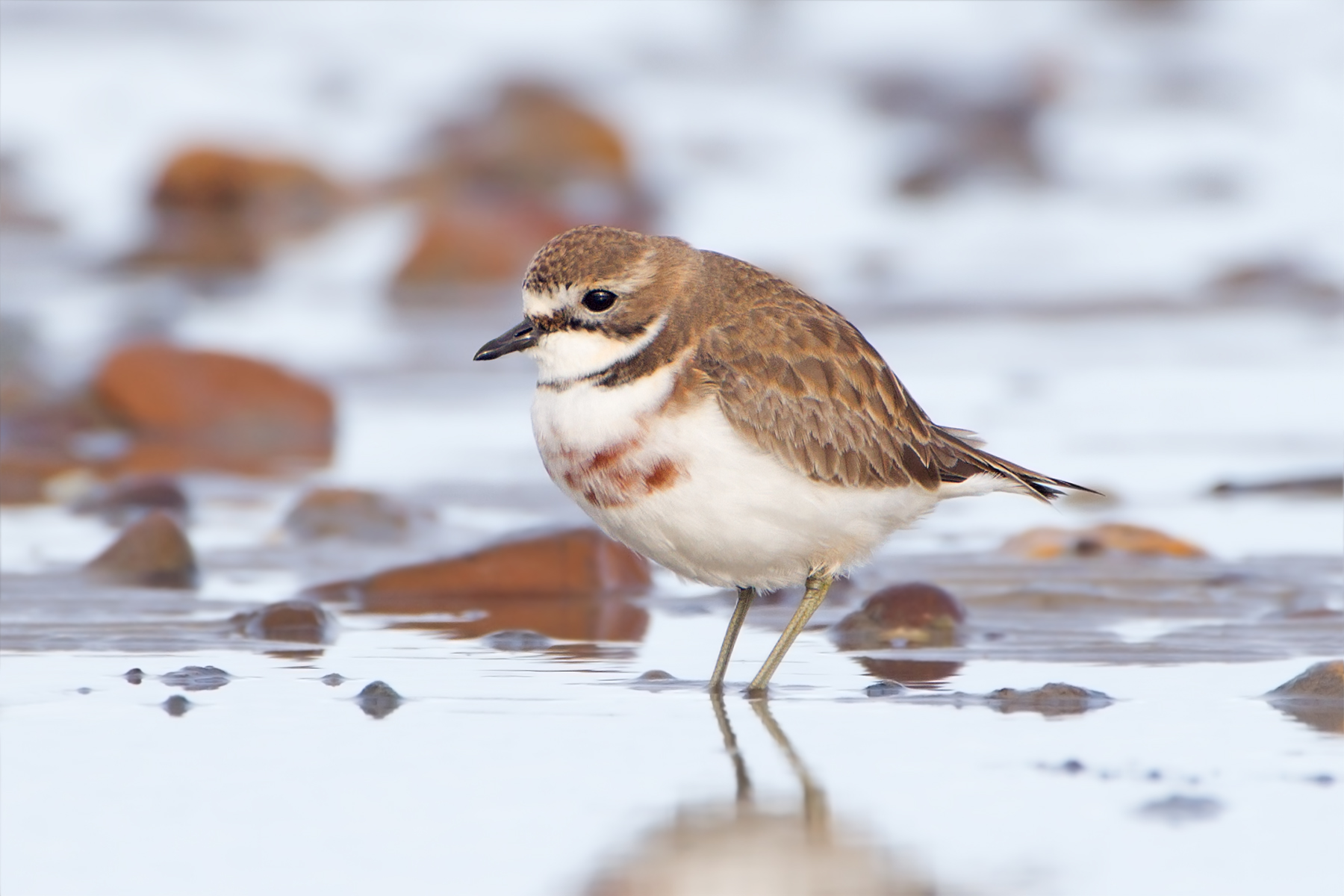
Double-banded plover in Tasmania transitioning to breeding plumage

Distribution of the banded dotterel varies seasonally. They are at their breeding grounds, which are entirely in New Zealand, from roughly August to November. Many move to coastal locations in New Zealand in the immediate post-breeding season (roughly December to March). A large proportion of the population migrates to Australia in autumn and winter (roughly April to July).

Banded dotterels breed throughout much of the North and South Islands and their offshore islands, plus Stewart Island, the Chatham Islands and the Auckland Islands. The largest number nest on the braided riverbeds of Marlborough, Canterbury, Otago and Southland in the South Island. Many others breed on shingle riverbeds in Hawke's Bay, the Manawatū Plains and the Wairarapa in the North Island. Some nest on sandy coasts, especially near the mouths of streams or rivers in the North and South islands. Small numbers breed in higher altitude areas such as Tongariro National Park and subalpine areas of Central Otago.

In the summer months of December to March the birds disperse somewhat from their breeding grounds, with many that nest in inland locations moving to estuaries and other coastal wetlands. In autumn and winter many move further, with most that nest in the riverbeds and outwash fans of the South Island high country migrating 1,600 kilometres or more to south-eastern Australia, including Tasmania, remaining there until mid-winter. This more or less west–east flight is uncommon for migratory birds and unique among migratory wading birds, which usually fly on a north–south axis. Birds that breed in the South Island lowlands, the northern South Island and the southern two-thirds of the North Island mostly stay on the New Zealand coast, throughout the country, with some moving to harbours and estuaries in the northern North Island. Dotterels that nest near coastal wintering grounds may move only a few kilometres. Populations in the Chatham and Auckland Islands generally move only locally throughout the year, although a few from Auckland Island venture to Campbell Island. Vagrant birds reach New Caledonia, Vanuatu and Fiji.

Northern populations of banded dotterel commonly inhabit sandy beaches and sandpits, as well as a few pairs accustoming to shell banks in harbours, with a few found on gravel beaches, with nesting sites generally clustered around stream-mouths. In the breeding period, males construct numerous nests on open patches of slightly elevated sand or on shells and occasionally in cushion plants which are all mostly padded with various materials retrieved from close by. Birds in the southern parts of New Zealand, such as Stewart Island, prefer to breed on unprotected subalpine and stony areas, but become coastal during off-breeding months where they feed around the beach areas.

The first fossil record of Anarhynchus bicinctus was found in rock shelter called Te Waka #1, 900 m above sea level in inland Hawke's Bay, North Island, New Zealand.

== Behaviour ==
=== Breeding ===
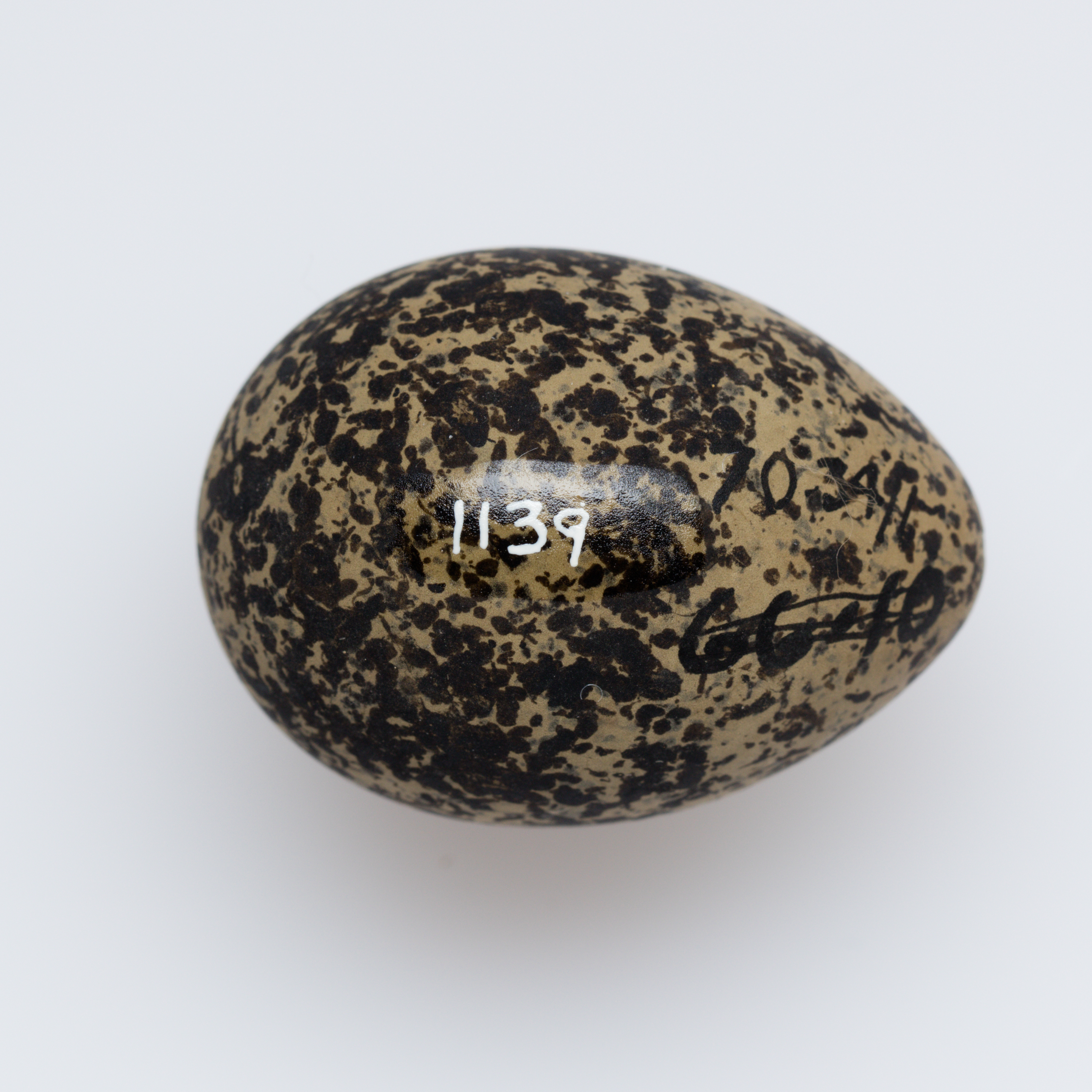
Banded dotterel egg, Auckland Museum collection

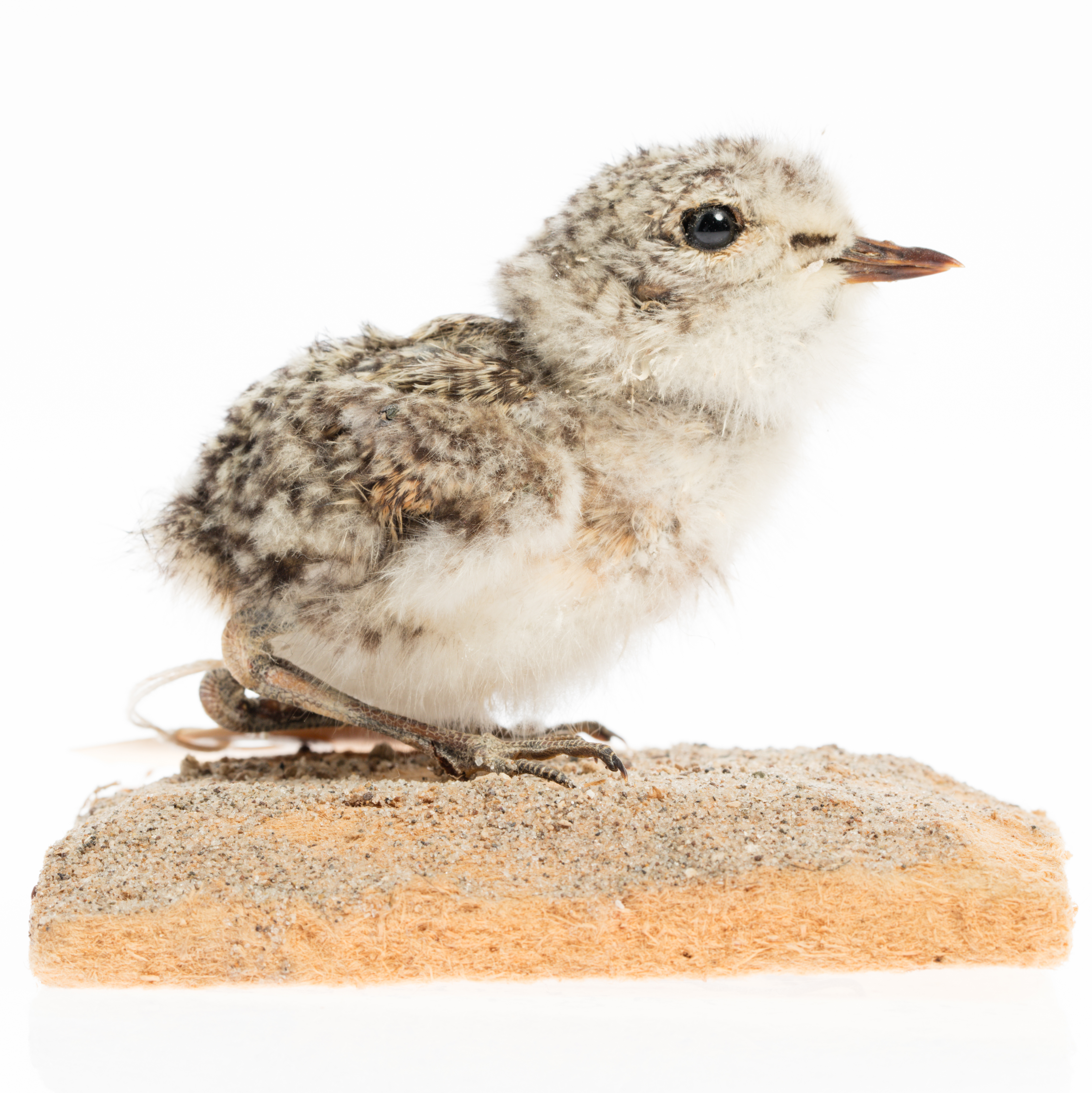
Banded dotterel chick (mounted), Auckland Museum collection

Banded dotterels start returning to North Island breeding areas in June–July and to inland Canterbury areas in August–September. They form seasonal monogamous pairs where once a partner is found, they remain with that one bird for the rest of the breeding season to help raise the young. During this time, the male grows colored bands on his chest prior to the beginning of the breeding season and later females are attracted by the loud calls of the male where they are then presented with several nests which they can choose between while the male puts on a defensive display, protecting his territory, where it flies towards any possible intruder in a fast butterfly-like circular motion flight. This species usually constructs nests upon slightly elevated, open patches on the sand, shells or sometimes hollows in cushion plants or between rocks which are broadly padded with various materials such as tussock tillers, smaller stones and shells, grass, lichen, moss, twigs etc.

There can be several hundred birds in one area during this season. From August to September, the dotterels lay two to four eggs and can re-lay up to three times if there is a failure or predation. Incubation of these eggs generally takes 28–30 days where the young fledging period extends to around six weeks.

Chicks leave their nest within a day of hatching and accompany their parents in the hunt for food. At the slimmest indication of potential danger, watchful adult birds sound the alarm causing the chicks to run a few feet in a scattered motion then squat with their legs doubled over beneath them and their head stretched out firmly against the ground in front of them, camouflaging into the coastal terrain around them. They remain stationed without moving until the parents decide the surrounding environment is clear and safe to move again. Unlike the young of most bird species, these chicks will be reliant to feed themselves with parents guarding close by for five to six weeks until they fledge. The parents will then stay close by for several days until the chicks join flocks and become fully independent.

Both of the parents continue to tend their young for another two weeks when birds have grown their contour feathers and the birds all part ways. Some of these birds migrate to southern Australia. Other dotterels fly to the northern areas of New Zealand in groups alongside many other adults and newly fledged chicks. A high percentage of offspring return to the breeding grounds for mating within their first year, with the rest of the generation returning in their second year.

=== Feeding ===
Double-banded plovers are predominantly opportunistic carnivores, feeding on aquatic invertebrates and other insects along coastlines or rivers. They have been known to also consume berries off nearby shrubs such as Coprosma and Muehlenbeckia.

The birds forage both in daytime and at night, using different techniques for each. During the day, plovers were seen spending greater amounts of time flying and more time standing alert and watchful. The birds were observed to walk, peck, run, forage, and groom both day and night, however during the day the number of paces walked was much greater than movement at night as the birds would spot insect movement and move at a fast pace to the area to peck before moving off again.

During the night, double-banded plovers were noted to have a repeated pecking techniques and spent a lot more time waiting in one area, suggesting that they were trying to use the nearby vicinity to catch prey in, due to the fact that prey detection distances would have been significantly reduced in lack of light. This reduction of paces during the night causes prey to find it more difficult to detect the stilled birds, which increases the ability of the plovers to detect their prey and decreases the chance that prey could be unnoticed.

Birds located on breeding grounds were commonly found to have a more varied diet containing insect larvae, spiders, beetles, aquatic insects such as caddisflies, stoneflies and mayflies along with terrestrial flies. The contents of various fecal samples from plovers included flies, adult beetles and bugs. Birds on Canterbury riverbeds consume large amounts of fruits of Coprosma petrei and Mueblenbeckia axillaris.

== Predators, parasites and diseases ==
As a ground-nesting bird, many dangers arise through predation by mammalian predators that were introduced to New Zealand, human impacts that can cause habitat loss and various parasites that can target these birds.

A study of nesting sites in braided rivers in the Mackenzie Basin in the 1990s found that predation, mainly of eggs, occurred at about half the nests. Feral cats were the most common predator of eggs there, followed by hedgehogs and ferrets, and to much lesser extent, stoats. Cats also killed adult birds and chicks. Cats, ferrets and stoats prey on rabbits too and when high rabbit numbers are reduced by human control or disease, predation of dotterel nests increases due to prey switching.

Other animals such as farm stock and uncontrolled dogs moving through nesting areas pose a threat to the nesting birds by crushing eggs and disturbing nesting birds.

Feather mites (Brephosceles constrictus) can pose a threat to the health of these birds as they feed predominantly on the blood of the bird along with feathers, skin or scales taking up to two hours. This can lead to increased levels of stress resulting in anemia, decreased egg production and in some cases, death.

== Hunting and conservation ==
Prior to 1908, banded dotterels in New Zealand were shot in large numbers by market gunners upon the return of migrating birds for breeding. In 1908, the species was placed on the protected list, prohibiting further shooting, to the point where they are now moderately common.

In 2013 local Maori in the Pencarrow Coast, Wellington region, placed a rahui on the area, to protect 20 pairs of banded dotterel from dogs and cars. This species has the conservation status of "Regionally Vulnerable" in the Wellington region. The species is classified as Near Threatened.

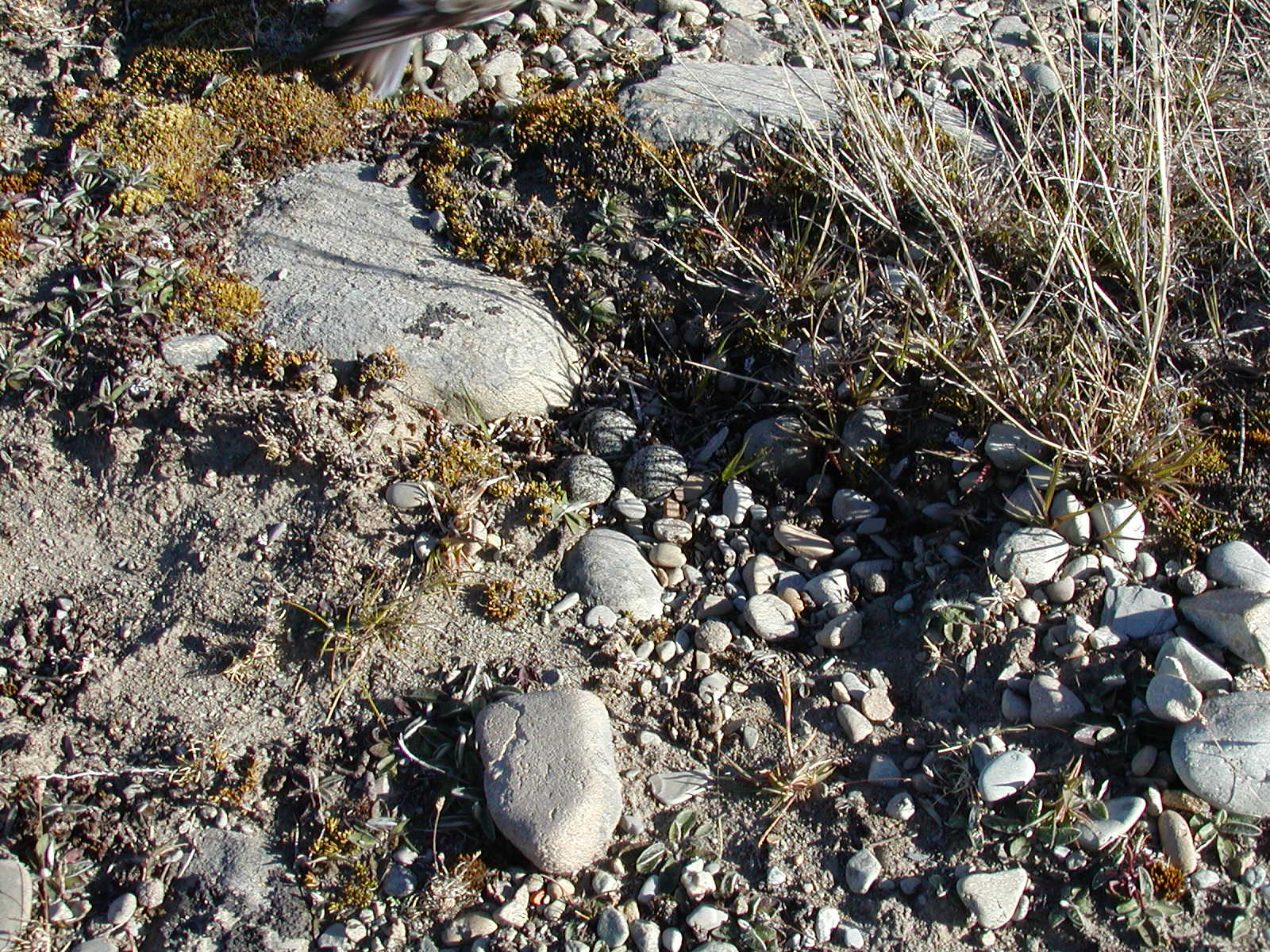
A double-banded plover nest

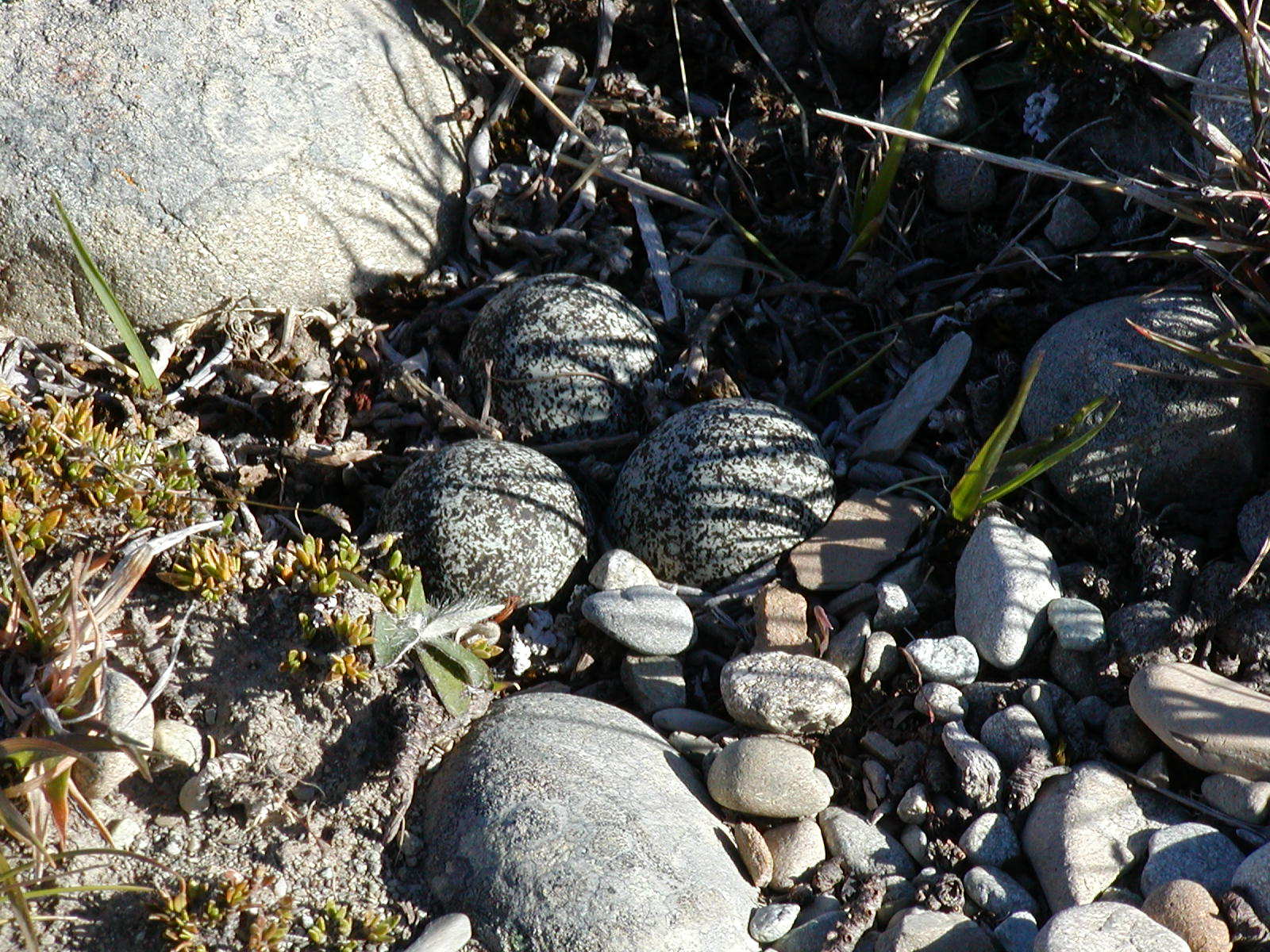
Double-banded plover eggs

== Videos ==
August, SE Queensland, Australia

April, SE Queensland, Australia
