= Dotterel (disambiguation) =

The dotterel or Eurasian dotterel (Eudromias morinellus) is a species of plover found in the Northern Hemisphere.

Dotterel may also refer to other plovers:

- Banded dotterel or Double-banded plover (Anarhynchus bicinctus)
- Black-fronted dotterel (Thinornis melanops)
- Hooded dotterel (Thinornis cucullatus)
- Inland dotterel (Peltohyas australis)
- New Zealand dotterel (Anarhynchus obscurus)
- Red-kneed dotterel (Erythrogonys cinctus)
- Shore dotterel (Thinornis novaeseelandiae)
- Tawny-throated dotterel (Oreopholus ruficollis)

== Other uses ==
- Dotterel (1817 ship), launched in British India, wrecked in 1827

== See also ==
- Doterel (disambiguation)
- Dotterel filefish (Aluterus heudelotii), an Atlantic fish
