= Doterel =

Doterel may refer to:

- HMS Doterel, several ships of the Royal Navy
- Doterel class sloop, a class of ship
- Dotterel, a wading bird, formerly spelled doterel

== See also ==
- Dotterel (disambiguation)
