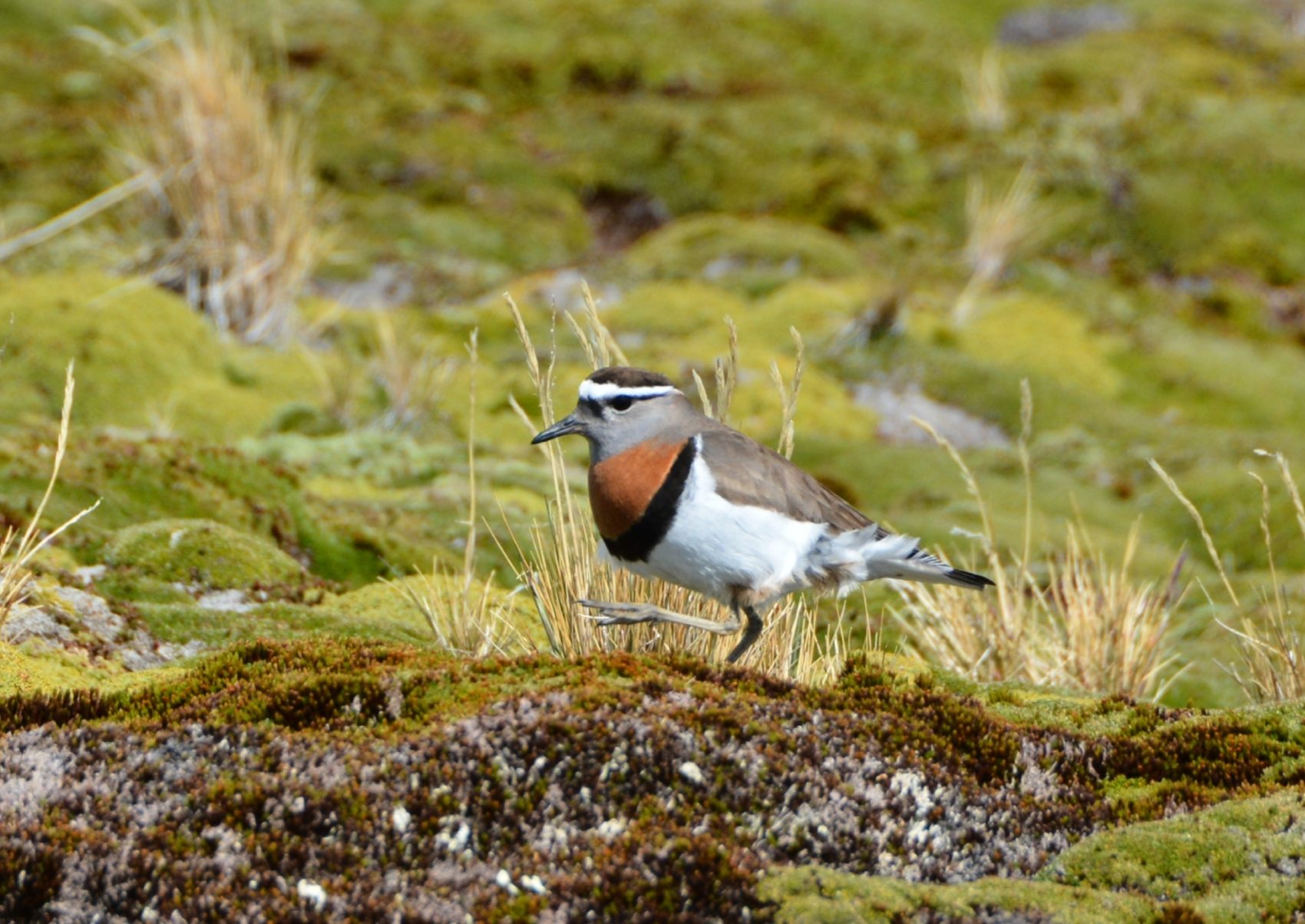

Conservation status
- Least Concern (IUCN 3.1)

Scientific classification
- Kingdom: Animalia
- Phylum: Chordata
- Class: Aves
- Order: Charadriiformes
- Family: Charadriidae
- Genus: Zonibyx; Reichenbach, 1852
- Species: Z. modestus

Binomial name
- Zonibyx modestus (Lichtenstein, MHC, 1823)
- Breeding Resident Non-breeding

Synonyms
- Charadrius modestus

= Rufous-chested dotterel =

Species of bird

The rufous-chested dotterel (Zonibyx modestus) or rufous-chested plover, is a species of bird in subfamily Charadriinae of family Charadriidae. It is found in Argentina, Brazil, Chile, Uruguay, and the Falkland Islands.

== Taxonomy and systematics ==
The rufous-chested dotterel is placed by itself in genus Zonibyx by several authors and International Ornithologists' Union, but that treatment had not been widely accepted before 2023. There is some 21st century evidence that it does not belong in Charadrius. The rufous-chested dotterel is monotypic.

== Description ==
The rufous-chested dotterel is 19 to 22 cm (7.5 to 8.7 in) long and weighs 71 to 94 g (2.5 to 3.3 oz). Adult males in breeding plumage have a gray face with a bright white supercilium, a gray throat, and a brown crown. Their breast is bright rufous with a black band below it; the rest of the underparts are white and the upperparts brown. Adult females are similar but duller. Non-breeding adults replace the rufous and gray with pale brown; their upperparts feathers have bright fringes and their supercilium is creamy. Juveniles resemble the non-breeding adult but have darker brown upperparts and breast.

== Distribution and habitat ==
The rufous-chested dotterel is found on the Falkland Islands and coastally to somewhat inland in Argentina, Uruguay, extreme southeastern Brazil, and Chile. It has also been recorded as a vagrant in Paraguay and Peru. In the breeding season it primarily inhabits short grasslands away from the coast but also boggy or stony areas around inland lakes and coastal shingle. Outside the breeding season it inhabits inland eroded and flooded grasslands, marshes, and streams, and also coastal mudflats, beaches, and rocky shores.

== Behavior ==
=== Migration ===
The rufous-chested dotterel breeds in far southern Chile and Argentina and on the Falkland Islands. A few remain in those areas year-round but most migrate north as far as northern Chile and extreme southern Brazil. A few occasionally move further to Peru and Paraguay. Adults begin their migration as soon as the young are independent.

=== Feeding ===
The rufous-chested dotterel forages in grasslands and along the edge of ponds, waterways, and the sea. During the breeding season it often defends small feeding territories and outside it often forages in flocks of 30 or more. Its diet is mostly small invertebrates including adult and larval insects and molluscs, and also includes some plant material such as algae.

=== Breeding ===
The rufous-chested dotterel's egg season is mostly October and November, and includes September on the Falkland Islands. Its nest is a depression in the ground, often in the open. The clutch size is usually two eggs but sometimes three; both parents incubate. The incubation period and time to fledging are not known.

=== Vocalization ===
The rufous-chested dotterel's breeding season flight display includes "a long series of short staccato notes often followed by a burry drawn-out croak, 'pic..pic..pic..pic..pic..grrrrrrahr'." Its flight call is "a wheezy whistle 'wheeerr'".

== Status ==
The IUCN has assessed the rufous-chested dotterel as being of Least Concern. It has a large range but its population size and trend are not known. No immediate threats have been identified. It is "generally reckoned to be not uncommon" and its habitat in "zones with relatively limited human impact suggests species [is] likely to be secure at present".
