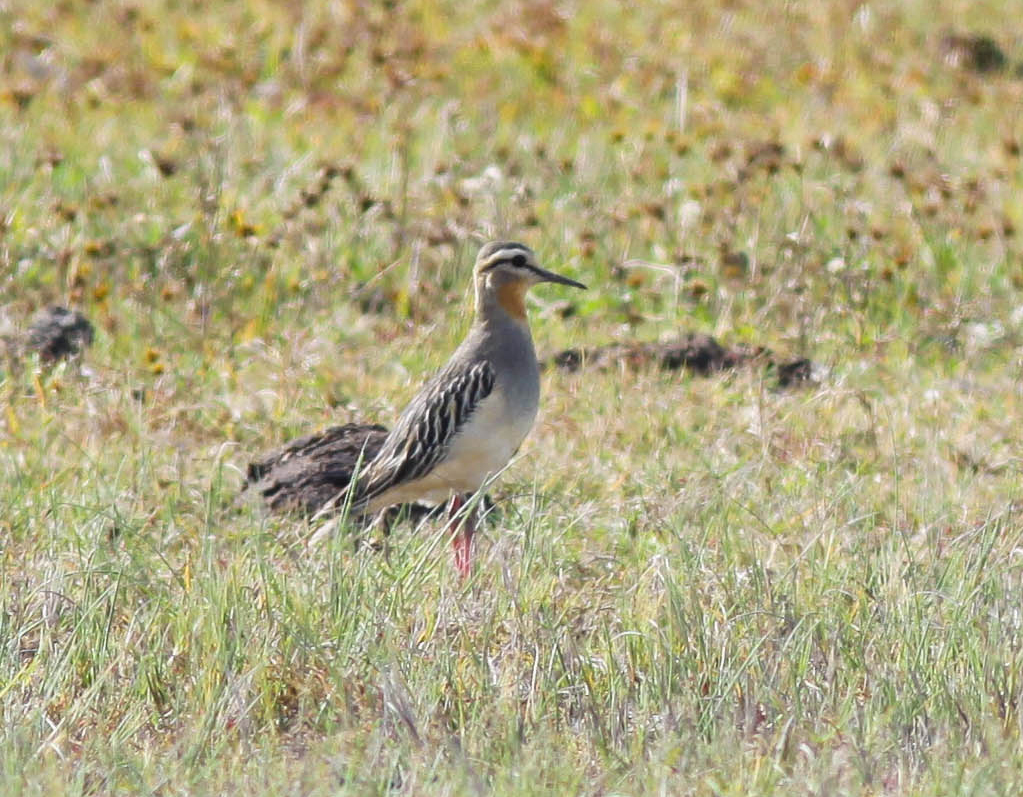
- Brazil

Conservation status
- Least Concern (IUCN 3.1)

Scientific classification
- Kingdom: Animalia
- Phylum: Chordata
- Class: Aves
- Order: Charadriiformes
- Family: Charadriidae
- Genus: Oreopholus
- Species: O. ruficollis

Binomial name
- Oreopholus ruficollis (Wagler, 1829)

Synonyms
- Charadrius ruficollis (Wagler, 1829); Eudromias ruficollis (Wagler, 1829)

= Tawny-throated dotterel =

Species of bird

The tawny-throated dotterel (Oreopholus ruficollis) is a species of bird in the family Charadriidae, the plovers and their relatives. It is found in Argentina, Bolivia, Brazil, Chile, Peru, and Uruguay.

== Taxonomy and systematics ==
The tawny-throated dotterel is the only living member of its genus, though an extinct species O. orcesi is known from fossil remains. It has two subspecies, the nominate O. r. ruficollis and O. r. pallidus. Some authors have suggested that the two deserve further investigation because they have different plumage .

== Description ==
The tawny-throated dotterel is 25 to 29 cm (9.8 to 11 in) long and weighs 120 to 154 g (4.2 to 5.4 oz). The sexes are alike and have no seasonal changes in plumage. Adults of the nominate subspecies are mostly rich buff, with heavy dark streaking on the back. They have a white chin, an orange-tawny throat, gray neck and breast, and a small black patch on the belly. Their white underwing shows in flight. Juveniles have a buff throat, less dense streaking on the back, and paler underparts with a brown belly patch. Subspecies O. r. pallidus is very similar to the nominate but smaller and overall paler.

== Distribution and habitat ==
Subspecies O. r. pallidus of the tawny-throated dotterel has a limited range; it is found in coastal northern Peru only as far south as the Department of La Libertad. What is assumed to be this subspecies has been recorded as a vagrant in Ecuador. The nominate subspecies is found from southern Peru south through western Bolivia, Chile, and western Argentina into Tierra del Fuego and east through southern Argentina into Uruguay and southern Brazil. It has also been recorded as a vagrant on the Falkland Islands.

The tawny-throated dotterel inhabits grasslands, heath shrublands, and fields and meadows. The nominate subspecies is found in the puna of the Andes as high as 4,600 m (15,100 ft). O. r. pallidus is found on the coastal plain of Peru.

== Behavior ==
=== Movement ===
The nominate subspecies of tawny-throated dotterel breeds in the high Andes and moves to lower elevations after that season. Some move to coastal Chile. Populations in the far south migrate north into Argentina and beyond as far as southern Brazil. O. r. pallidus appears to be a year-round resident in its limited range.

=== Feeding ===
Almost nothing is known about the tawny-throated dotterel's feeding behavior or diet. It is known to feed in flocks of as many as 100 birds in the non-breeding season.

=== Breeding ===
The tawny-throated dotterel's nesting season appears to span from June to January with some latitudinal variation. O. r. pallidus nests on sandy soil near sea level. The species' nest, clutch size, incubation time, and time to fledging are not known.

=== Vocalization ===
The tawny-throated dotterel is not highly vocal. In flight it makes "a vibrating drawn-out whistle 'prrrrruu'...and a rhythmic 'chup!-prri-rri-rruu'". Its alarm call is "an emphatic 'chee!-chu-chup'."

== Status ==
The IUCN has assessed the tawny-throated dotterel as being of Least Concern. It has a large range, but its estimated population of under 6700 mature individuals is believed to be decreasing. No immediate threats have been identified. It occurs in several protected areas but there is evidence that hunting during fall migration is a potential threat.
