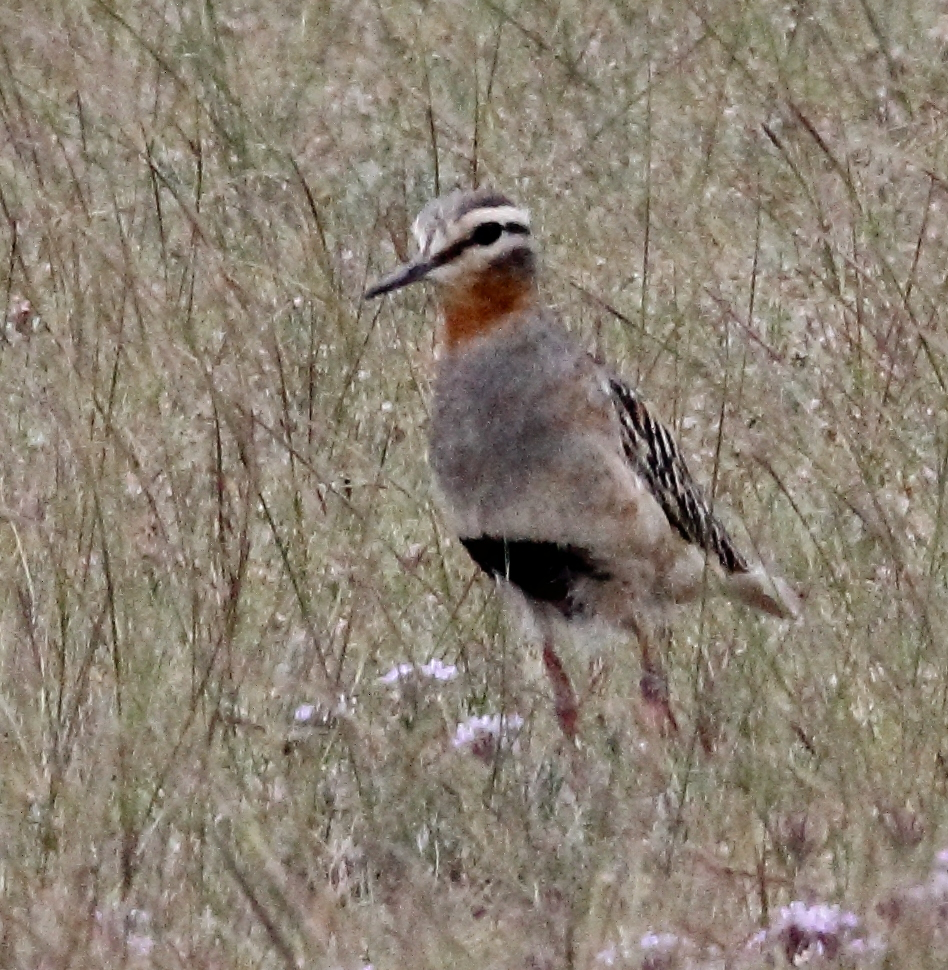
- Tawny-throated dotterel (Oreopholus ruficollis)

Scientific classification
- Kingdom: Animalia
- Phylum: Chordata
- Class: Aves
- Order: Charadriiformes
- Family: Charadriidae
- Subfamily: Charadriinae
- Genus: Oreopholus; Jardine & Selby, 1835

Species
- Oreopholus ruficollis; †Oreopholus orcesi

= Oreopholus =

Genus of bird

Oreopholus is a genus of bird belonging to the family Charadriidae. The tawny-throated dotterel (Oreopholus ruficollis) is the only extant species, although another species, Oreopholus orcesi, is known from the Late Pleistocene of Ecuador.
