= Terrestrial flies =

Artificial flies resembling terrestrial insects

- Artificial fly
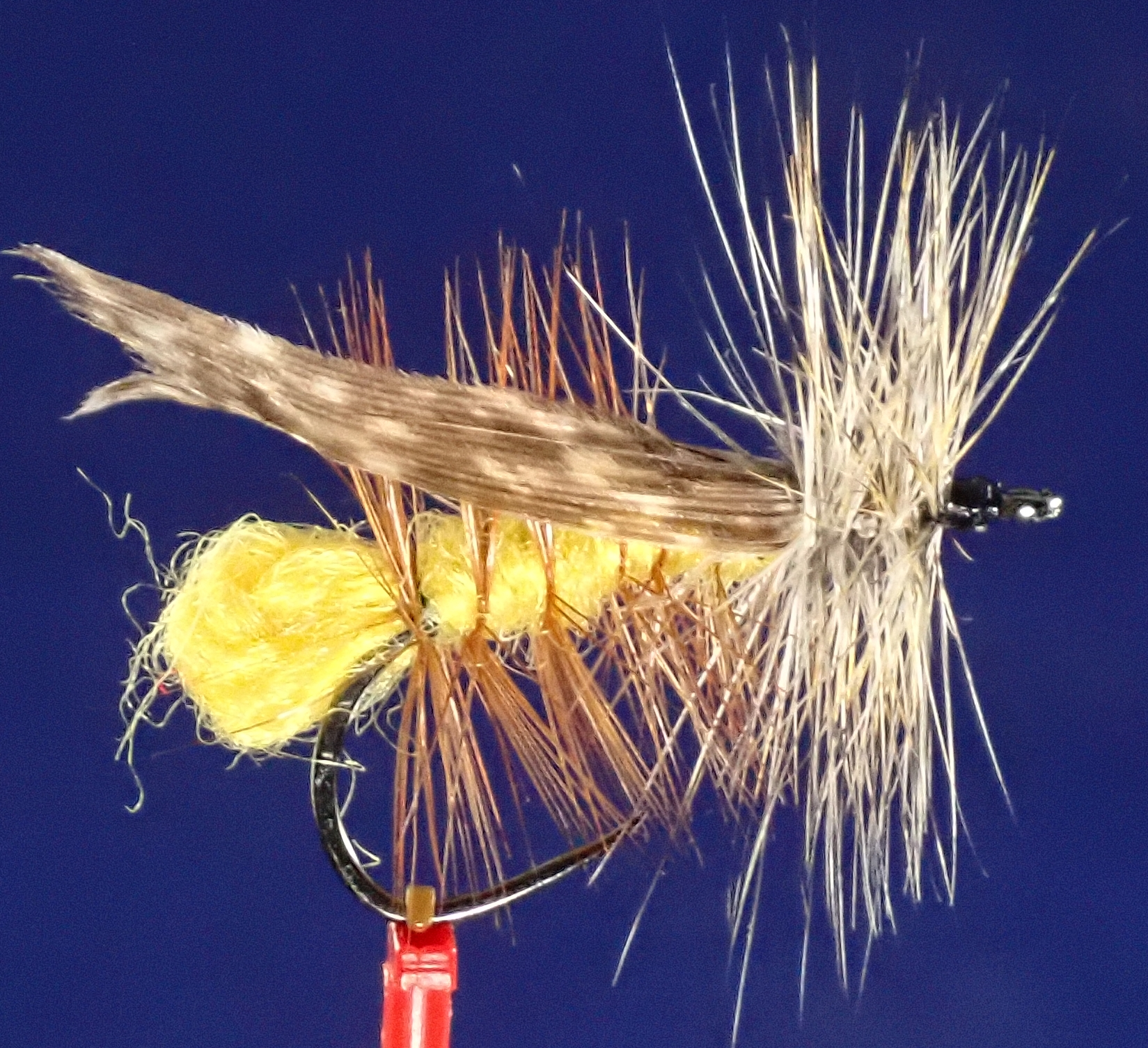
- Joes Hopper
- Type: Terrestrial fly
- Imitates: Adult Terrestrial insects

Materials
- Typical sizes: Dry fly sized to imitation
- Typical hooks: TMC 900, Firehole 718

Uses
- Primary use: Trout, Freshwater Bass (fish), Panfish

Terrestrial flies are a broad group of artificial flies used by fly anglers to imitate terrestrial insects that fall prey to fish in rivers, streams and lakes. Most typical are patterns imitating grasshoppers, crickets, ants, beetles, leaf hoppers, cicadas and moths.

== History ==
Terrestrial fly patterns as a class of artificial was developed in earnest in the 1950s with the publication of Vincent C. Marinaro's A Modern Dry Fly Code-The Classic and Revolutionary Book on Dry-Fly Fishing with Aquatic and Terrestrial Artificials (1950). In the early centuries of fly fishing, fly anglers certainly attempted to replicate just about any type of live bait used for fishing. Some of these flies were undoubtedly replicating terrestrial insects. The Palmer Worm of the 17th century was a heavily hackled fly that resembled a common fuzzy caterpillar, yet as Andrew Herd in The Fly-Two Thousand Years of Fly Fishing (2003) relates, palmer worms were never found in or on the water.

== General description ==
Most terrestrial patterns are designed to float and are fished as dry flies. They replicate a terrestrial insect that is either blown on to the water surface or falls into the water from bankside vegetation. Exceptions are patterns replicating ants may be designed to sink as when ants drown, they sink. Early terrestrial patterns relied on hair, fur, hackle and other feathers to craft the fly. Modern terrestrial patterns rely heavily on foam, rubber and other synthetic materials.

== List of Terrestrial patterns ==
=== Hoppers ===
As described in Trout Flies-A Tier's Reference (1999), Dave Hughes
- Letort Hopper (as originated by Vincent Marinaro, 1950)
- Dave's Hopper
- Henry's Fork Hopper
- Ensolite Hopper
- Parachute Hopper
- Madam X

As described in A Modern Dry-Fly Code (1950), Vincent C. Marinaro

- Pontoon Hopper

As described in Yellowstone Country Flies (2002), Bruce Staples

- Baler Hopper
- Bing's Hopper
- Bob's Hopper
- Centennial Hopper
- Dan's Hopper
- Deer Hopper
- EZX Hoppe
- Flat Creek Hopper
- Flying Grasshopper
- Foam Wing Hopper
- Fraud Hopper
- Halloween Hopper
- Harrop Hopper
- Hopper Buck
- Humpy Hopper
- Jacklin's Hopper
- John's Hopper
- Madison River Stopper
- Pat's Hopper
- Phil's Hopper
- Stan's Hopper

As Described in Yellowstone Country Flies-The Fly Patterns of Parks' Fly Shop (2013), Walter Wiese

- Wiese's Bob's Hoppers
- GFA Hopper Series
- Little Green Letort Hopper
- Wrapped Foam Hopper Series
Hopper Patterns
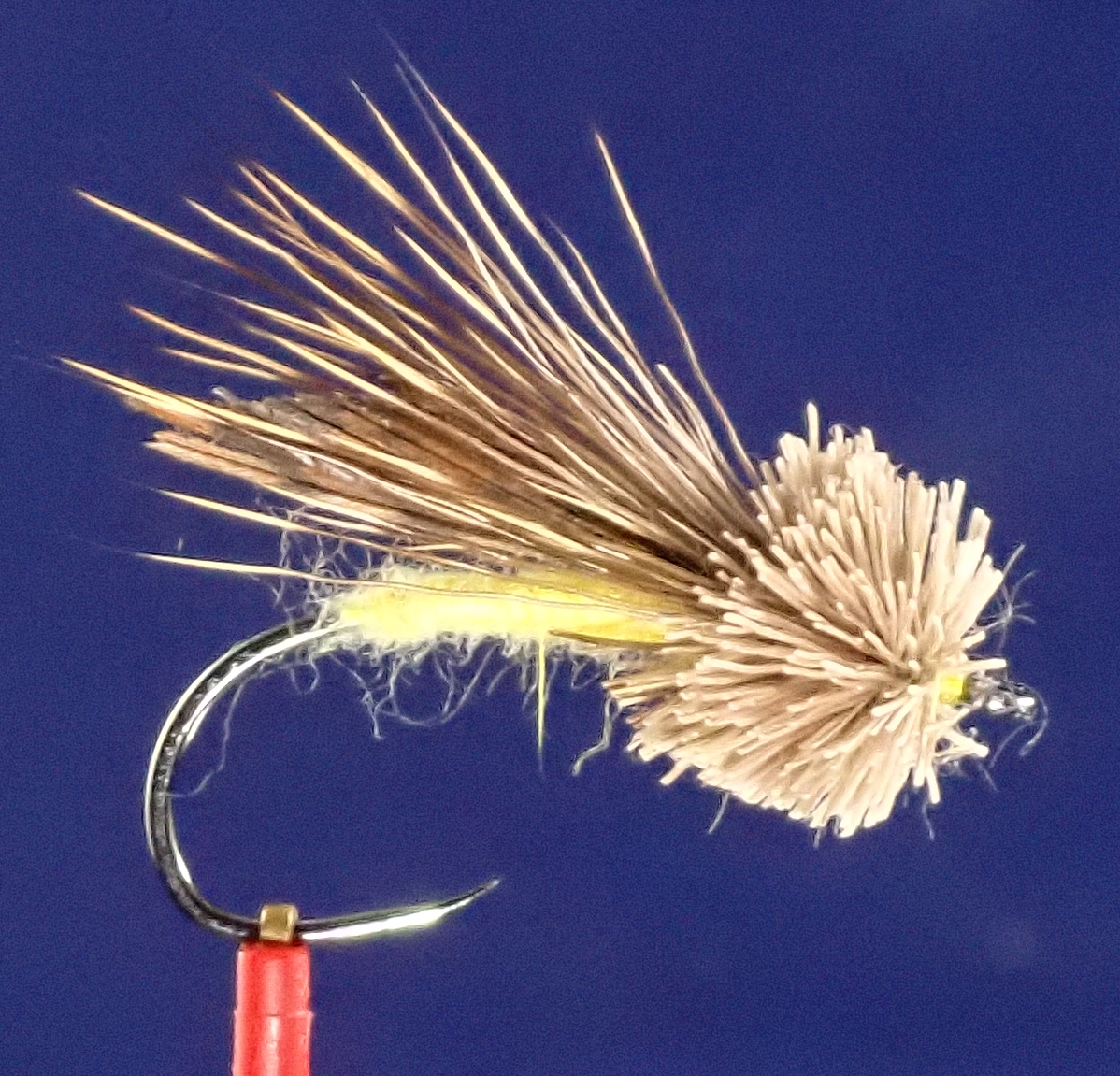
Letort Hopper

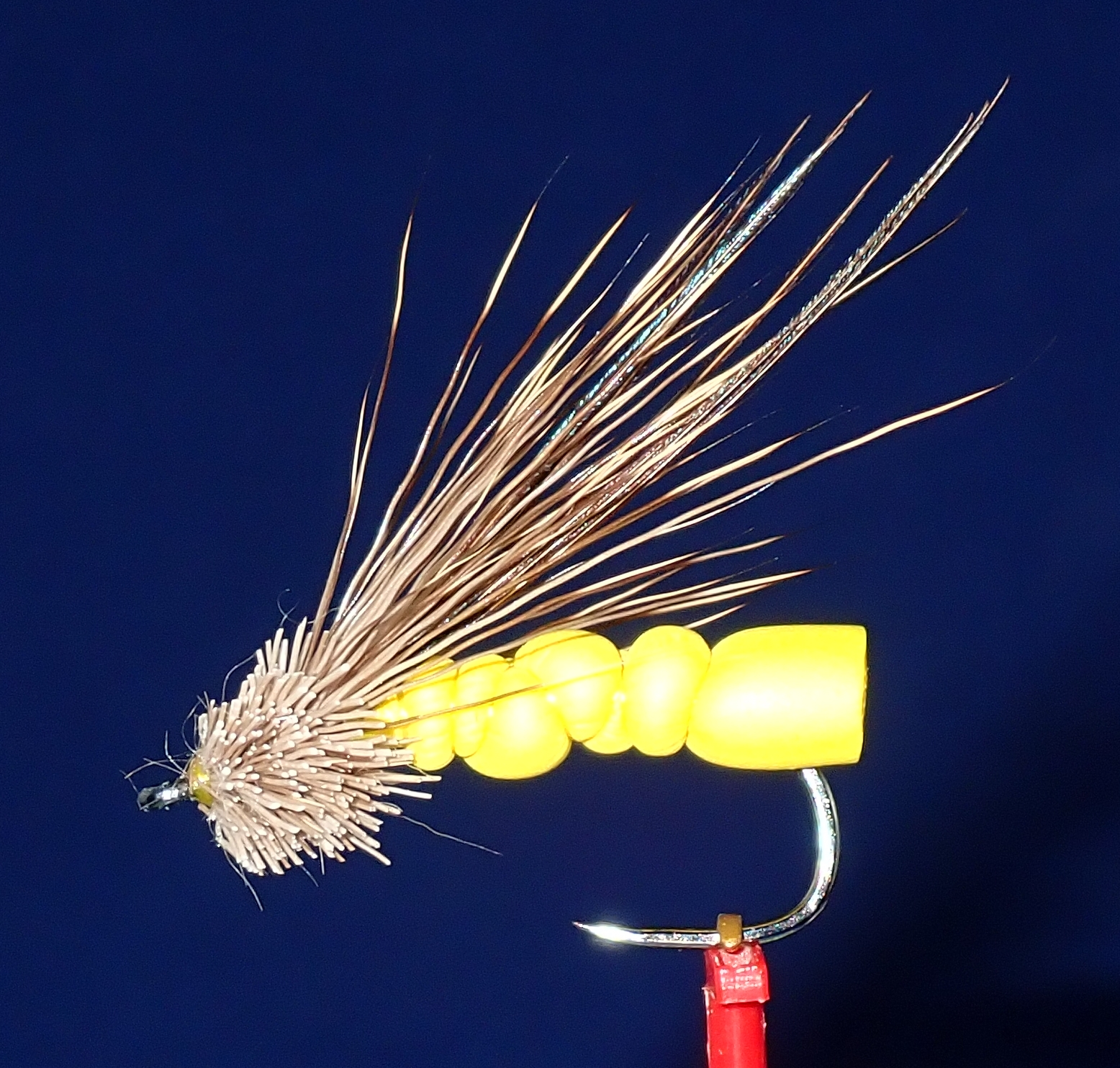
Ensolite Hopper

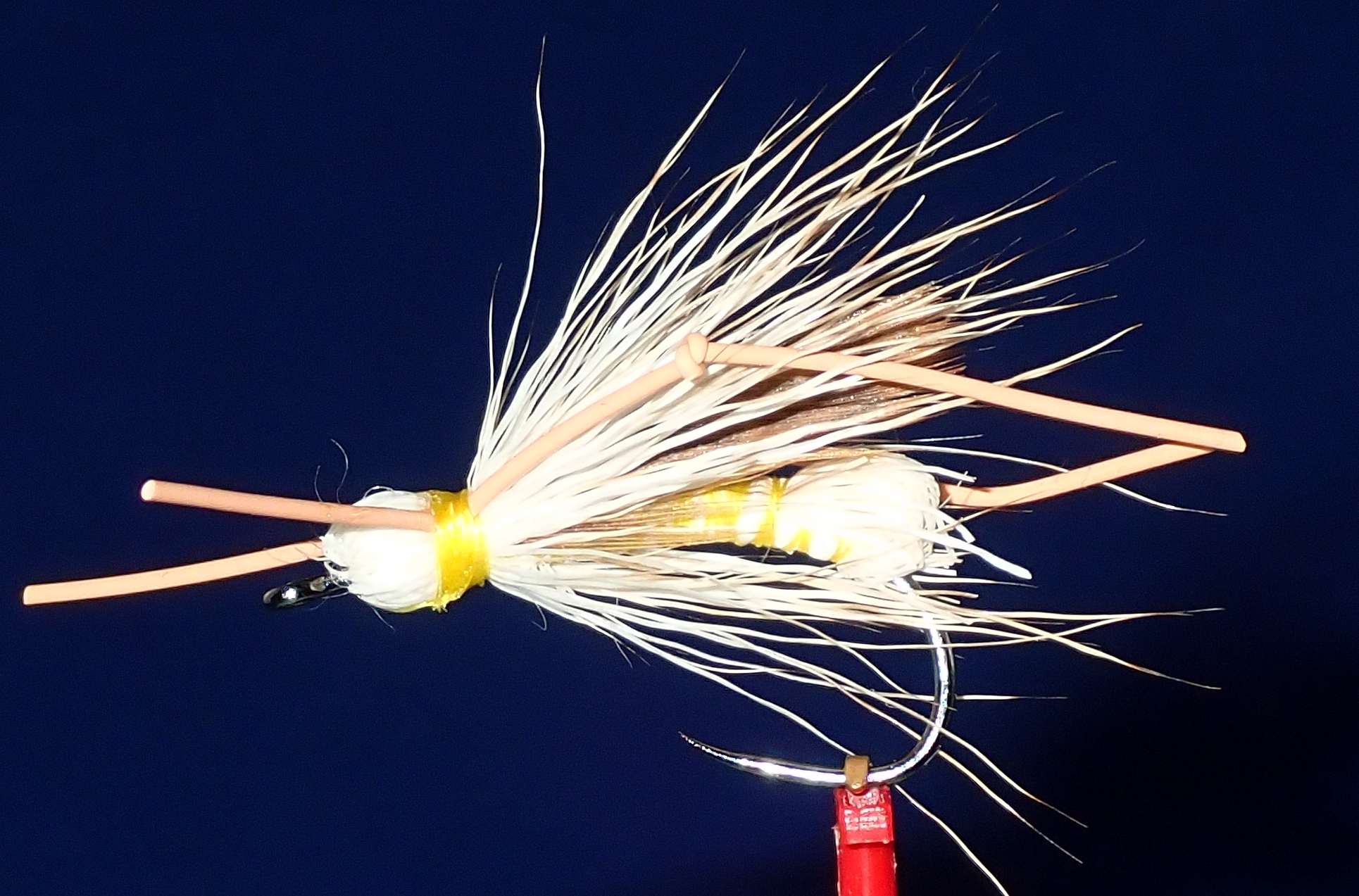
Henry's Fork Hopper

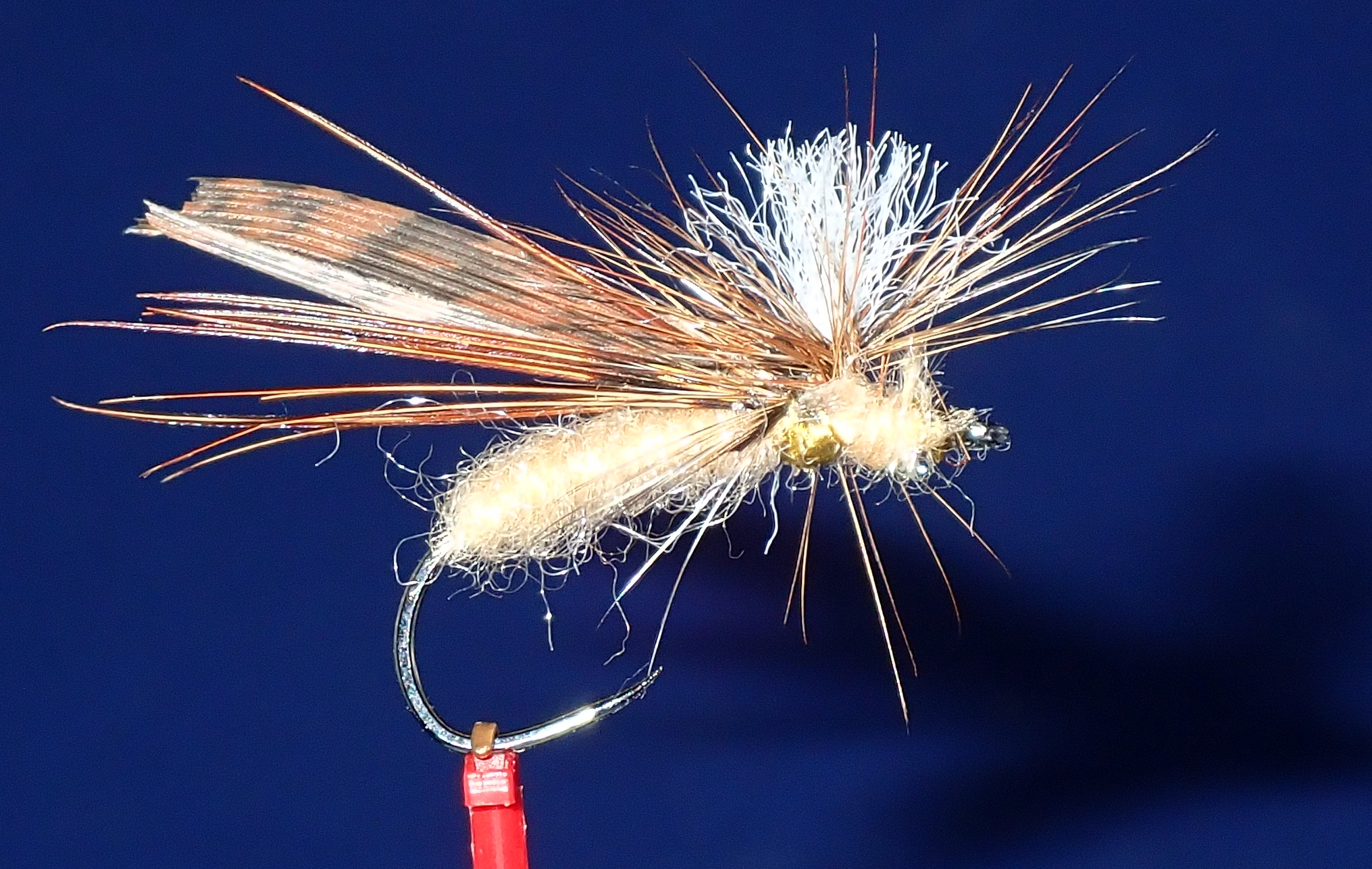
Parachute Hopper

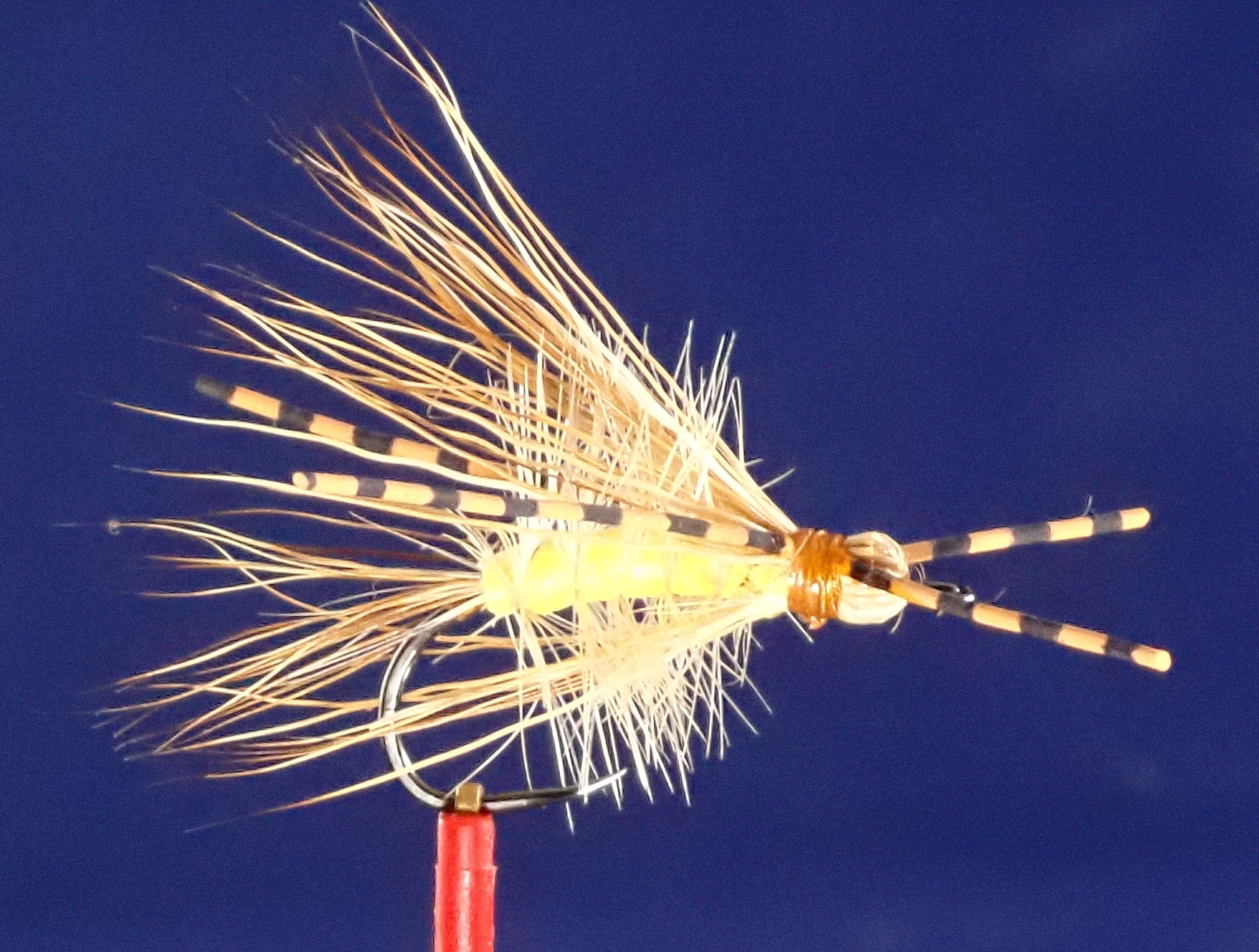
Madam X

=== Crickets ===
As described in Trout Flies-A Tier's Reference (1999), Dave Hughes
- Letort Cricket (as originated by Vincent Marinaro, 1950)
- Dave's Cricket
- Henry's Fork Cricket
- Ensolite Cricket

=== Ants ===
As described in Trout Flies-A Tier's Reference (1999), Dave Hughes

- Black Fur Ant
- Cinnamon Fur Ant
- Black Foam Ant
- Brown Foam Ant
- Black Winged Ant
- Cinnamon Winged Ant
- Quick-sight Ant
- Black Sinking Ant
- Cinnamon Sinking Ant
- Black and Red Sinking Ant

As Described in Yellowstone Country Flies-The Fly Patterns of Parks' Fly Shop (2013), Walter Wiese

- Glasshead Ant Series
- Hiz-Viz Bicolor Para Ant
Ant Patterns
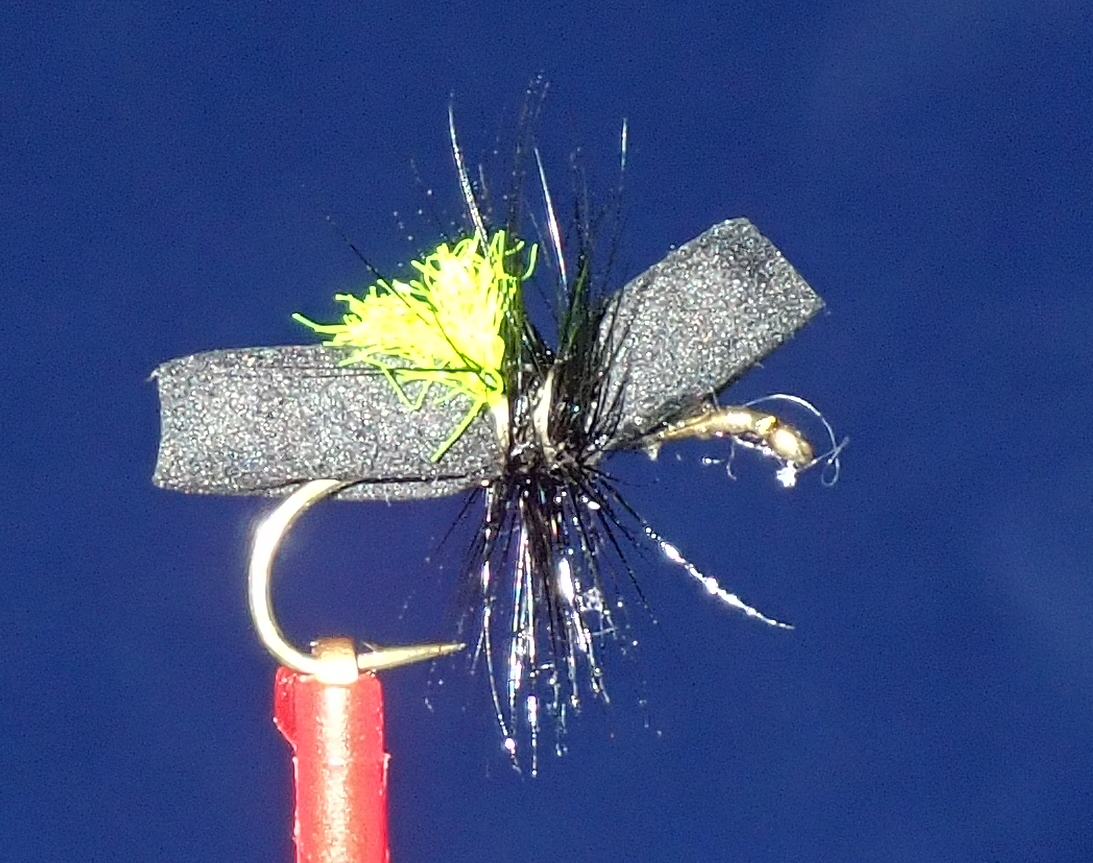
Black foam ant

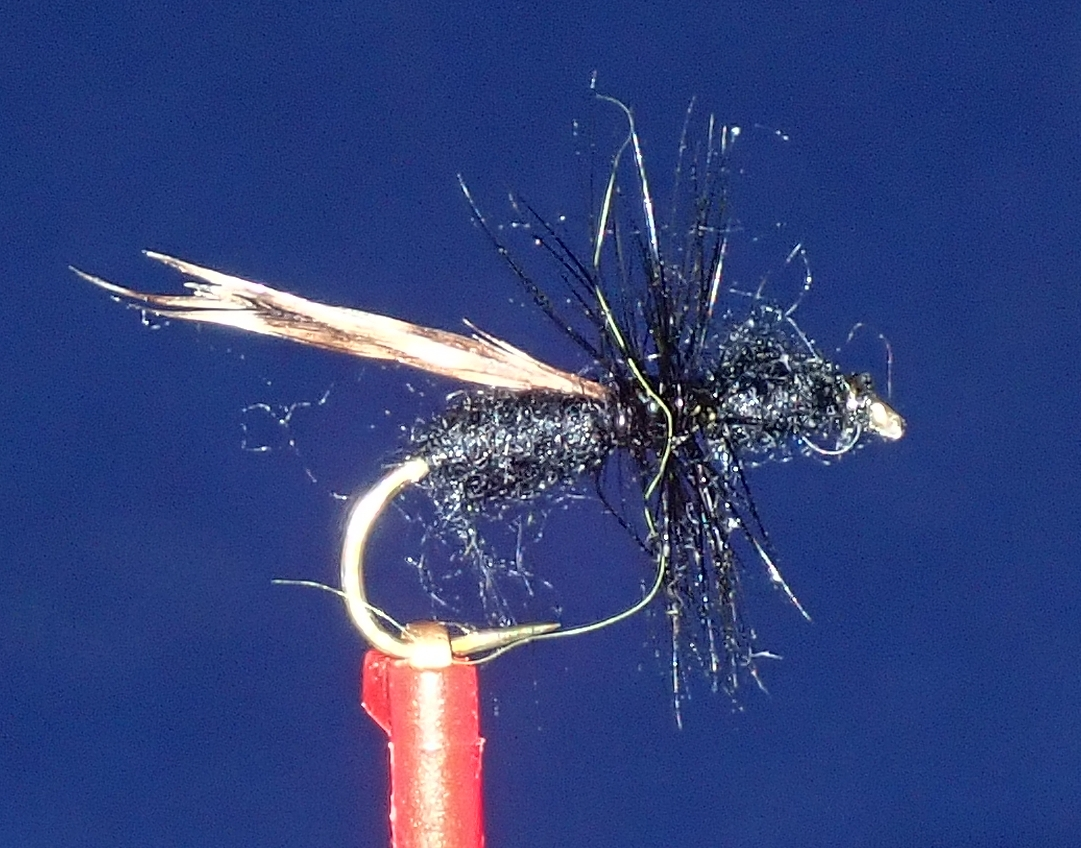
Black winged ant

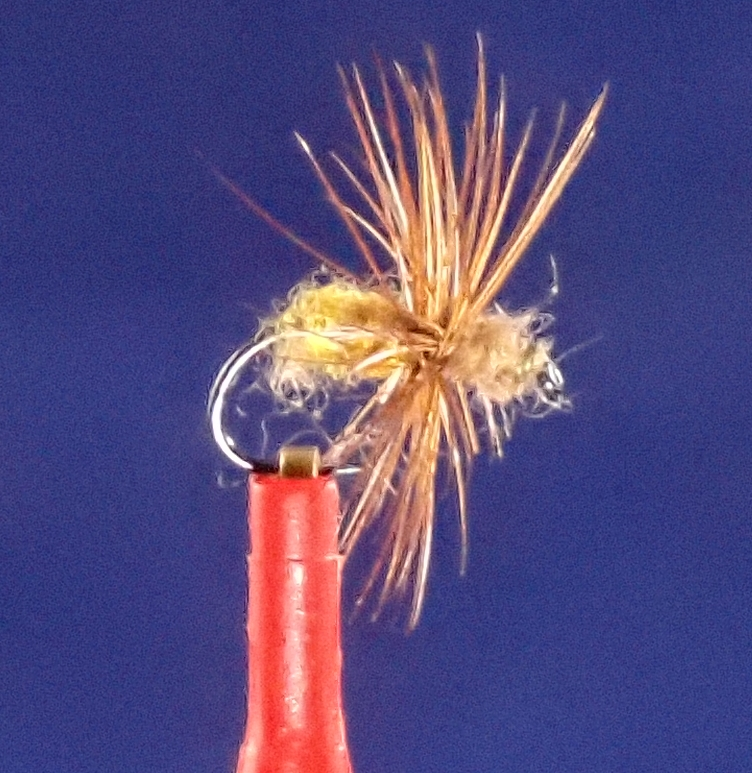
Cinnamon fur ant

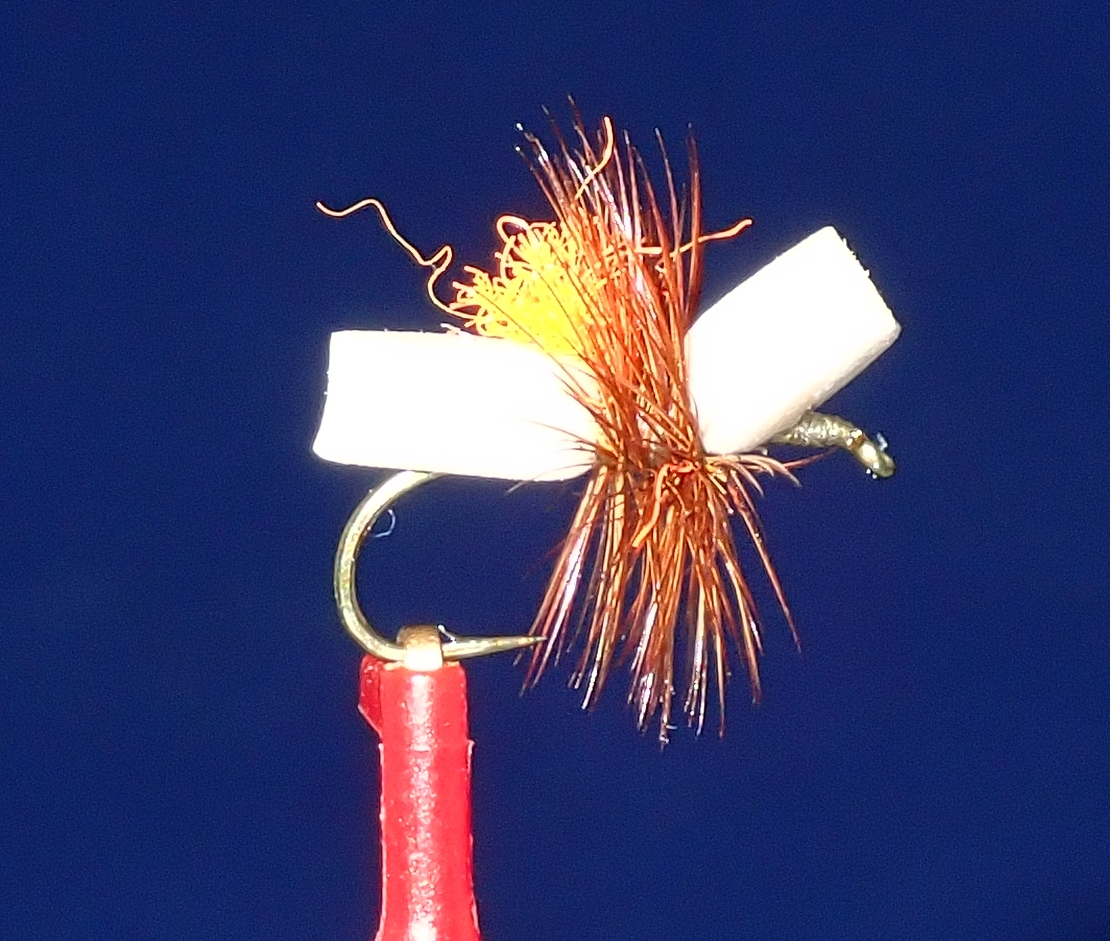
Tan foam ant

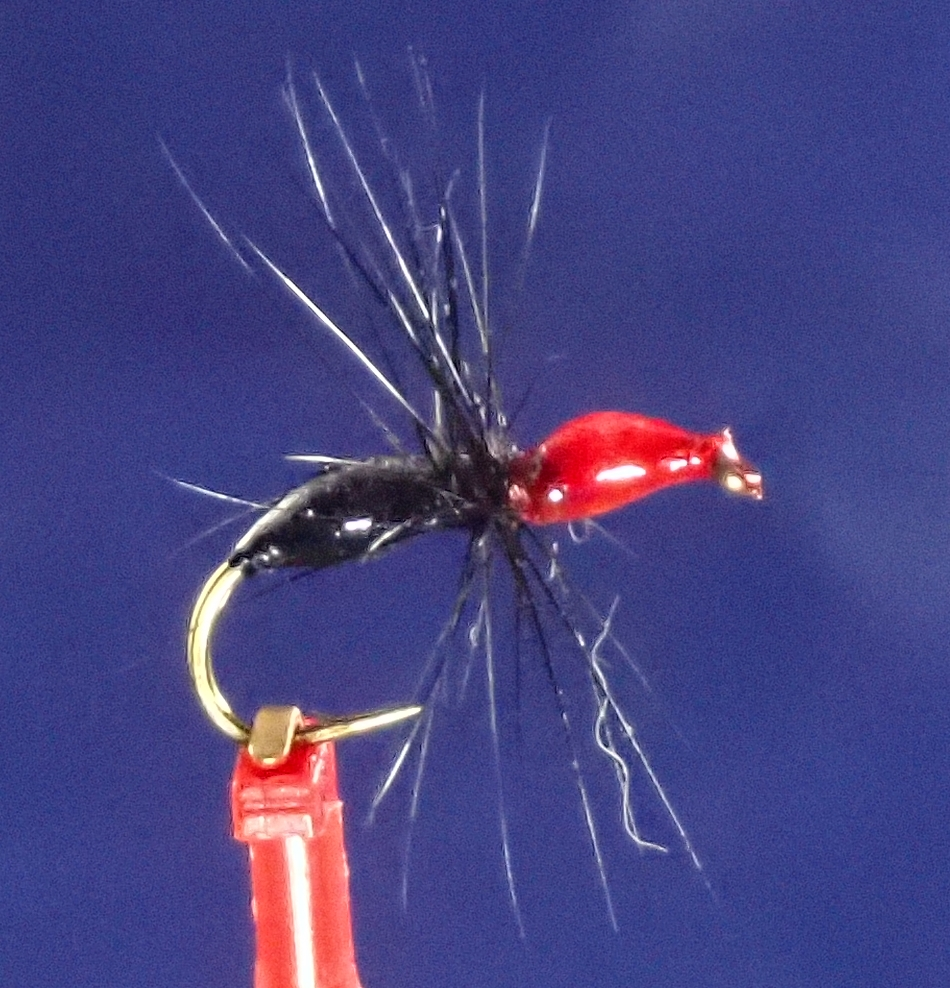
Black and red sinking ant

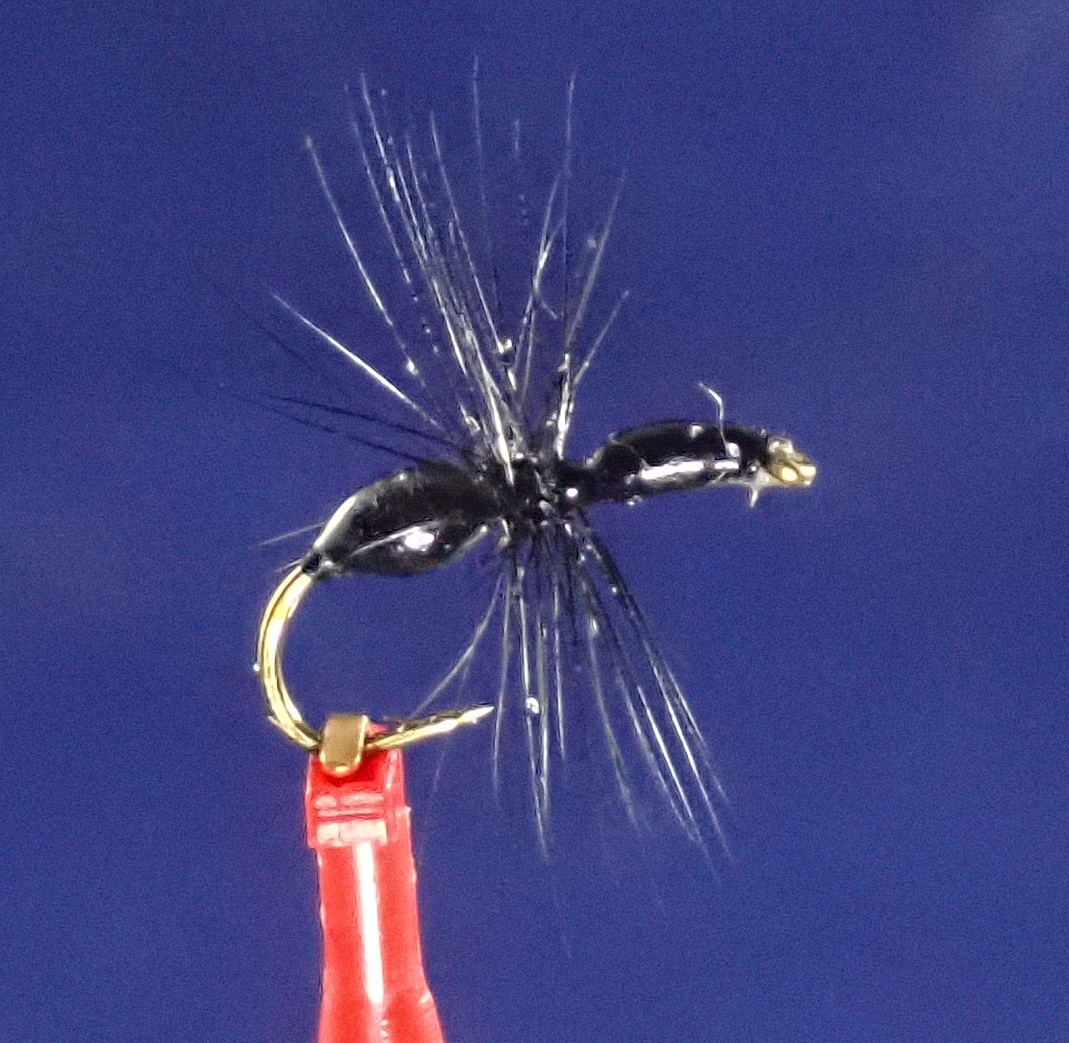
Black sinking ant

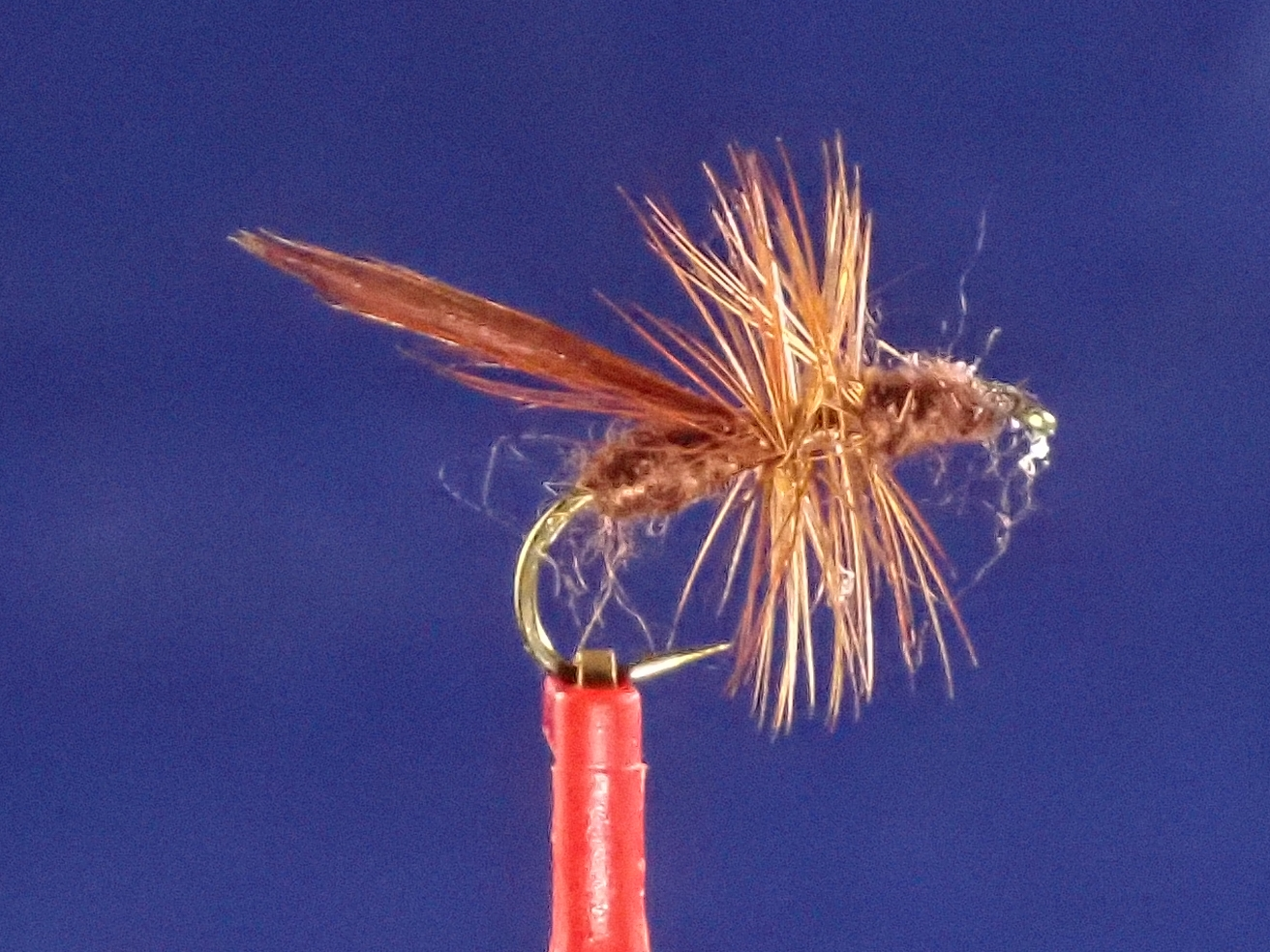
Brown winged ant

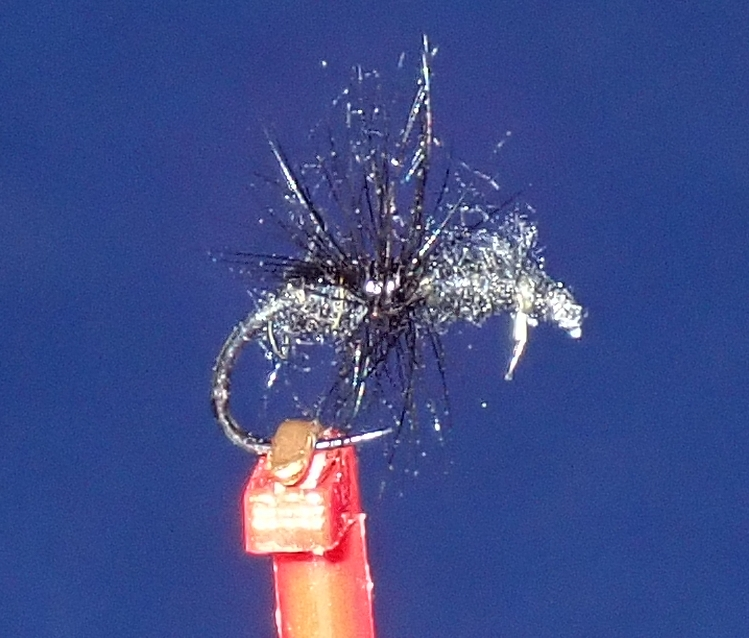
Black fur ant

=== Beetles ===
As described in Trout Flies-A Tier's Reference (1999), Dave Hughes
- Black Crowe Beetle
- Natural Deer Hair Beetle
- Brown Deer Hair Beetle
- Black Featherwing Beetle
- Brown Featherwing Beetle
- Black Foam Beetle
- Brown Foam Beetle

As described in A Modern Dry-Fly Code (1950), Vincent C. Marinaro

- Beetle (Japanese Beetle) or Double Jassid
Beetle Patterns
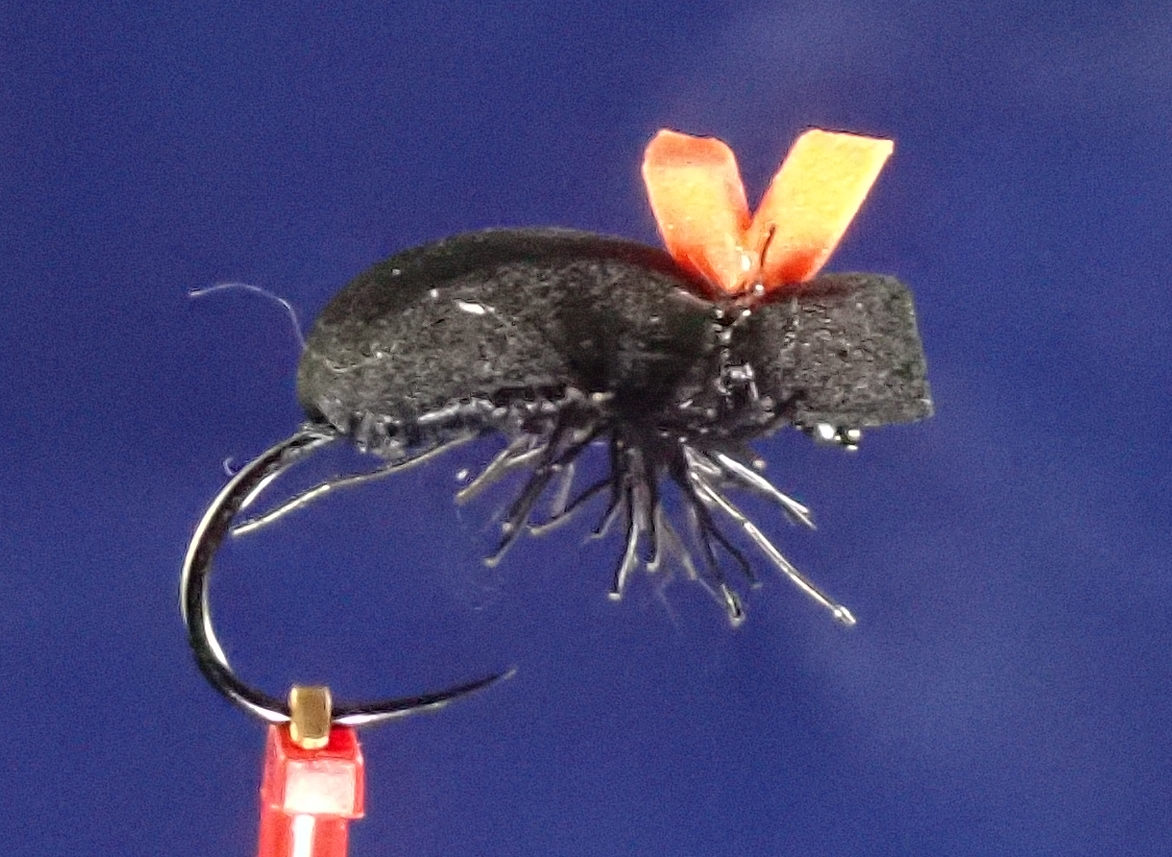
Black Foam Beetle

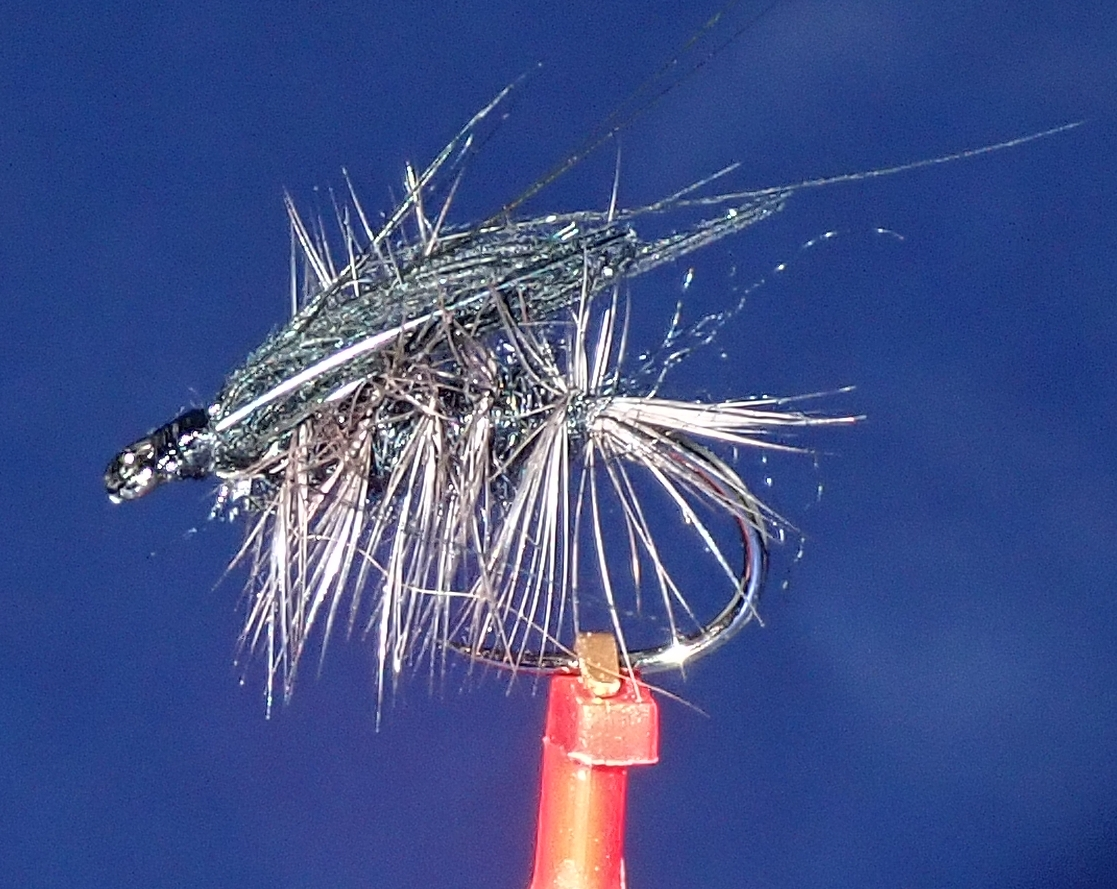
Black Featherwing Beetle

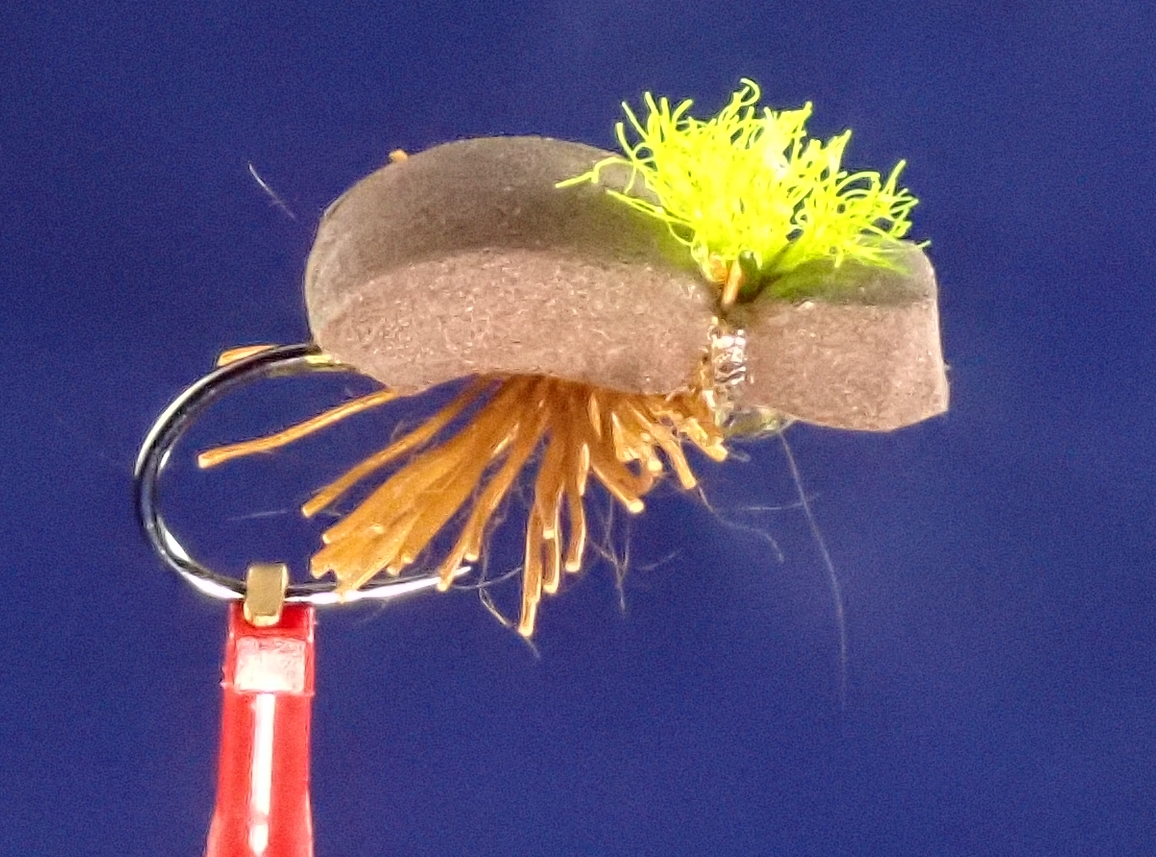
Brown Foam Beetle

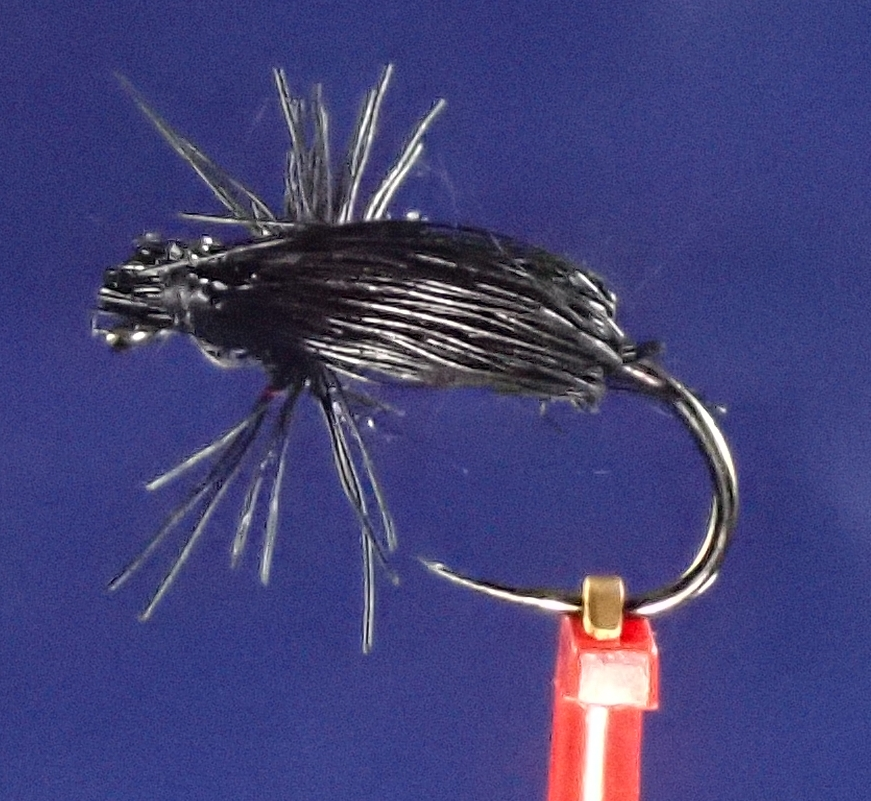
Black Crowe Beetle

=== Leaf Hoppers ===
As described in A Modern Dry-Fly Code (1950), Vincent C. Marinaro

- Jassid

=== Moths ===
As described in Fly Patterns-Tie Thousands of Flies (2008), Randall and Mary Kaufmann

- Hoolet Moth

As Described in Yellowstone Country Flies-The Fly Patterns of Parks' Fly Shop (2013), Walter Wiese

- Korn's Spent Spruce Moth

=== Cicadas ===
As described in Fly Patterns-Tie Thousands of Flies (2008), Randall and Mary Kaufmann

- Black Cicada
- Bullet Head Cicada
- Chad's Cicada
- Clark's Cicada
- Olive Foam Body Cicada
- Foam Parachute Cicada
- Green River Super Cicada
- Stout's Black Cicada
- Cicadicator
