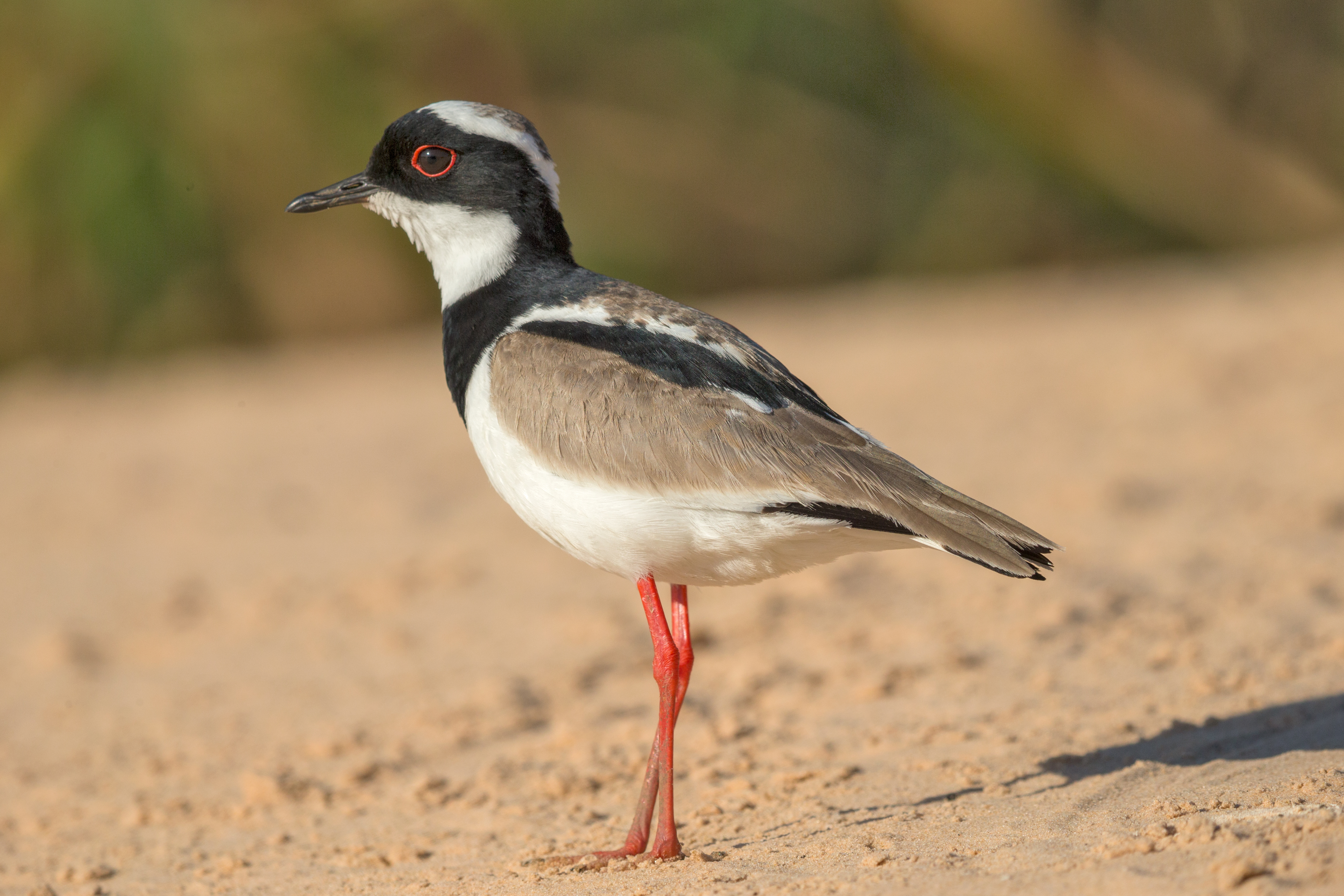

Conservation status
- Least Concern (IUCN 3.1)

Scientific classification
- Kingdom: Animalia
- Phylum: Chordata
- Class: Aves
- Order: Charadriiformes
- Family: Charadriidae
- Genus: Hoploxypterus; Bonaparte, 1856
- Species: H. cayanus

Binomial name
- Hoploxypterus cayanus (Latham, 1790)

Synonyms
- Charadrius cayanus Latham, 1790; Vanellus cayanus (Latham, 1790)

= Pied plover =

Species of bird

The pied plover (Hoploxypterus cayanus), also known as the pied lapwing, is a species of bird in the family Charadriidae. It is a bird of least concern according to the IUCN and can be found in northern South America. The species name cayanus refers to Cayenne, the capital of French Guiana, where the pied plover can be found.

== Taxonomy ==
The pied plover belongs to the order Charadriiformes known as the shorebirds. It is placed within the family Charadriidae and is the only species placed in the genus Hoploxypterus that was introduced in 1856 by the French naturalist Charles Lucien Bonaparte. The pied plover was formerly placed in the genus Vanellus but molecular phylogenetic studies have shown that it is not closely related to the other lapwings.

== Description ==
The pied plover is a strongly marked bird with a black and white pattern, buff on its back and wings, and white on its abdomen. Its eyes are encircled with bright red eye-rings. It has a prominent black V on its upper back and has long, red legs. It is a medium-sized bird like most of the species in the family Charadriidae, measuring around 22 centimeters.

There is no sexual dimorphism in this species; both males and females look the same. Juveniles look similar, with the exception of them being more buff and the presence of buff eye-rings instead of red ones.

Pied plovers are a quiet species, not calling very often. Their call sounds like "kee-oo", with the second part lower in pitch. When flying during their display, their call resembles repeated "klee" sounds.

== Distribution and habitat ==
Pied plovers live along the shores of lakes and rivers where there is sand and mud. They reside in the northern part of South America with their range covering Brazil, Bolivia, Paraguay, Peru, Colombia, Ecuador, Venezuela, Guyana, Suriname, and French Guiana.

Not much is known about its movements, but the pied plover seems to change habitat during different parts of the year. It has been observed to move as high as 2600 meters in altitude in Bolivia, possibly due to the wet season pushing it to higher ground.

== Behavior and ecology ==
Little is known about the pied plover's behavior. Conflicting behavior has been reported. At Serra da Capivara National Park in Brazil, they have been observed to flock only with members of their own species, not mixing with other waders along the shores. However, pied plovers at Tambopata Reserve in Peru were seen alone or in pairs, not flocking together.

=== Food and feeding ===
Not much is known about their diet. They mainly eat insects and snails but have been seen holding on to a crustacean with their bill, though it is unclear if they eat them. Notable prey for the pied plover are scorpions, which was documented in Brazil.

=== Breeding ===
Their displays consist of flying in the air in an undulatory pattern as they call. While on the ground, they stand facing each other with their wings spread. Generally, pied plovers mate between May and July and lay their eggs in July, though this varies by region.

Pied plovers nest on the ground, digging a shallow hole. The nest is unlined and their eggs are directly touching the ground. When they leave the nest, they cover the eggs with sand for protection.
