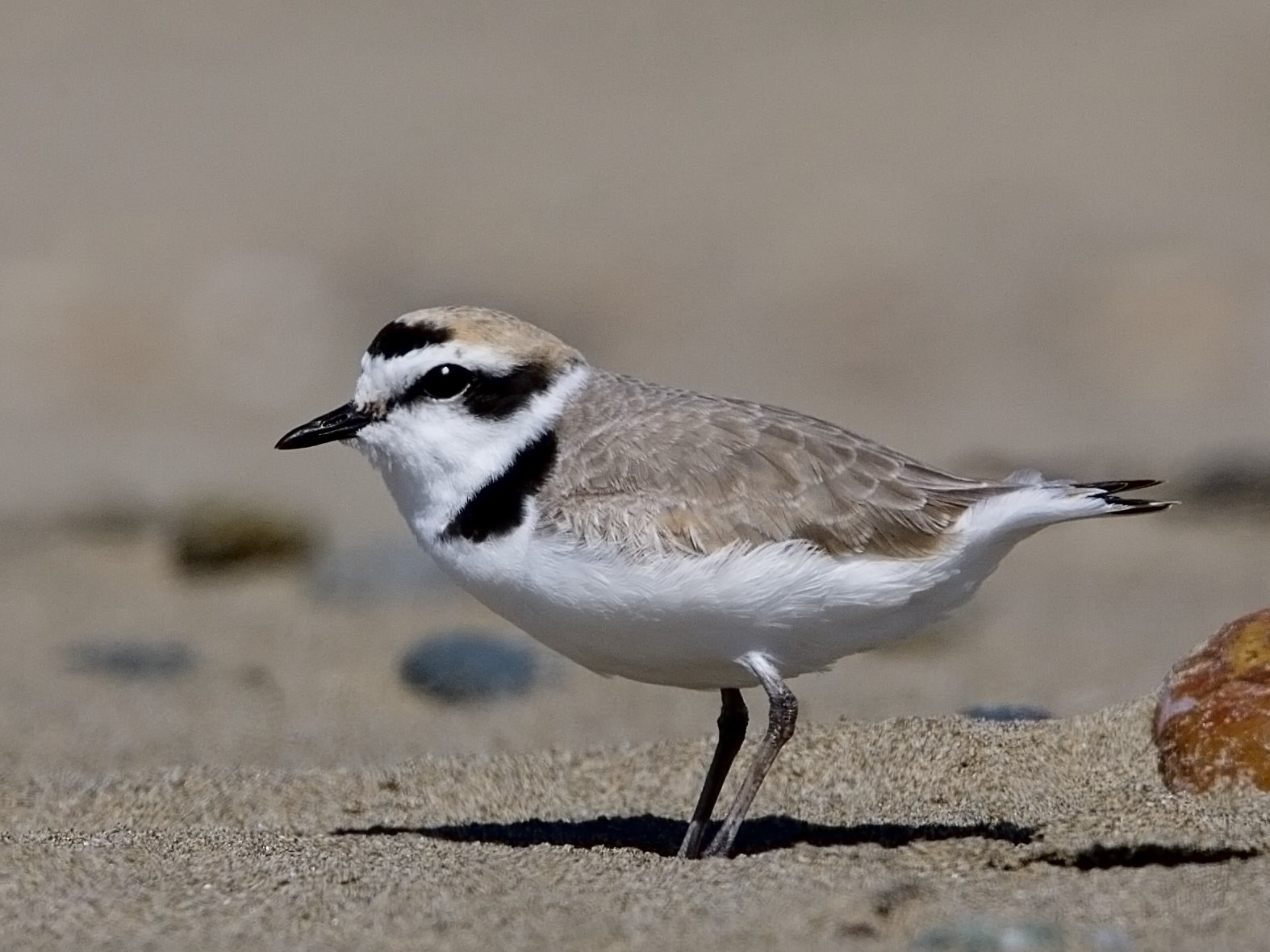
- Snowy plover (Anarhynchus nivosus)

Scientific classification
- Kingdom: Animalia
- Phylum: Chordata
- Class: Aves
- Order: Charadriiformes
- Family: Charadriidae; Leach, 1820

Genera
- Pluvialis; Oreopholus; Hoploxypterus; Phegornis; Zonibyx; Eudromias; Charadrius; Thinornis; Vanellus; Erythrogonys; Peltohyas; Anarhynchus

= Charadriidae =

Family of birds

The bird family Charadriidae includes the plovers, dotterels, and lapwings. The family contains 69 species that are divided into 12 genera.

== Taxonomy ==
The family Charadriidae was introduced (as Charadriadæ) by the English zoologist William Elford Leach in a guide to the contents of the British Museum published in 1820. Most members of the family are known as plovers, lapwings or dotterels. These were rather vague terms which were not applied with any great consistency in the past. In general, larger, broader-winged species have often been called lapwings, and the smaller, narrower-winged species plovers or dotterels. Until recently, it was thought these formed two major clear taxonomic sub-groups, with lapwings belonging to the subfamily Vanellinae, and all but one of the plovers and dotterels to Charadriinae; the last one placed in a small third subfamily Pluvianellinae containing only the Magellanic plover. Modern genetic evidence has however shown that this arrangement was polyphyletic, with in particular, many species traditionally placed in the plover genus Charadrius proving more closely related to the lapwings than they were to the type species of that genus, Charadrius hiaticula; as a result, those species have now been split out into the genus Anarhynchus (syn. Ochthodromus). The third former 'subfamily' proved so completely unrelated to the other plovers that it has been removed from the Charadriidae altogether and given its own monotypic family Pluvianellidae, its closest relatives being the strikingly different sheathbills.

The trend in recent years has been to rationalise the common names of the Charadriidae. For example, the large and very common Australian bird traditionally known as the 'spur-winged plover', is now the masked lapwing to avoid conflict with another bird with the same name; and the former 'sociable plover' is now the sociable lapwing.

The following genus-level cladogram is based on a molecular genetic study by David Černý and Rossy Natale that was published in 2022. The genera and the species numbers are from the list maintained by the AviList team.

- Charadriidae
  - Pluvialis – plovers (4 species)
  - - Oreopholus – tawny-throated dotterel
    - - - - Hoploxypterus – pied plover
          - - Phegornis – diademed sandpiper-plover
            - Zonibyx – rufous-chested dotterel
        - - Eudromias – Eurasian dotterel
          - - Charadrius – plovers and the killdeer (4 species)
            - Thinornis – plovers (7 species)
      - - Vanellus – lapwings (23 species)
        - - Erythrogonys – red-kneed dotterel
          - - Peltohyas – inland dotterel
            - Anarhynchus – wrybill and plovers (24 species)

== Description ==
They are small to medium-sized birds with compact bodies, short, thick necks and long, usually pointed, wings, but most species of lapwing have broader, more rounded wings. Their bill are usually straight (except for the wrybill) and short, their toes are short, hind toe can be reduced or absent, depending on species. Most Charadriidae also have relatively short tails, with the exception of the killdeer. In most genera, the sexes are similar, very little sexual dimorphism occurs between sexes. They range in size from the collared plover, at 26 grams and 14 cm (5.5 in), to the masked lapwing, at 368 grams (0.811 pounds) and 35 cm (14 in).

== Distribution and habitat ==
They are distributed through open country worldwide, mostly in habitats near water, although there are some exceptions: the inland dotterel, for example, prefers stony ground in the deserts of central and western Australia, and the killdeer is often found in grasslands in North America.

== Behaviour and ecology ==
They hunt by sight, rather than by feel as longer-billed waders like snipe do. Foods eaten include aquatic and terrestrial invertebrates such as insects, worms, molluscs and crustaceans depending on habitat, and are usually obtained by a run-and-pause technique, rather than the steady probing of some other wader groups. They also feed on plant material.

=== Breeding ===
The vast majority of Charadriidae have a socially monogamous mating system. Some, such as Northern lapwings, are polygynous, others, such as mountain plovers have a rapid multiple-clutch system that can be accompanied by sequential polyandry. In Eurasian dotterels, females compete for males and males provide all parental care. While breeding, they defend their territories with highly visible aerial displays.

Charadridae lay two to four eggs into the nest, which is usually a shallow scrape in the open ground, and incubate the clutch for 21–30 days. In species where both parents incubate the eggs, females and males vary in the way they share their incubation duties, both within and between species. In some pairs, parents exchange on the nest in the morning and in the evening so that their incubation rhythm follows 24-hour day, in others females and males exchange up to 20 times a day.

Most Charadriidae are protective over their eggs and offspring. The parents protect their young by uttering an alarm call, performing distraction display and they may even attack the predator or intruder. The chicks are precocial; their parents do not feed them.
