= HMS Doterel =

Several ships of the Royal Navy have borne the name HMS Doterel, after the wading bird more often spelled "dotterel":

- HMS Doterel (1808), a Cruizer-class brig-sloop launched on 6 October 1808, hulked in 1827 and broken up in about 1855.
- HMS Doterel (1837), the ex-Post Office wooden paddle packet Escape, purchased in 1837 and disposed of in 1850.
- HMS Doterel (1860), a Britomart-class gunboat launched on 5 July 1860 and sold to Marshall of Plymouth on 6 June 1871.
- HMS Doterel (1880), a Doterel-class sloop launched in 1880. She sank off the coast of Punta Arenas after an explosion on 26 April 1881 with the loss of 143 lives.
- HMS Doterel (1918), a yacht requisitioned in 1918 subsequently renamed Dotter
