= Dave's Hopper =

Artificial fly used for fishing

- Artificial fly
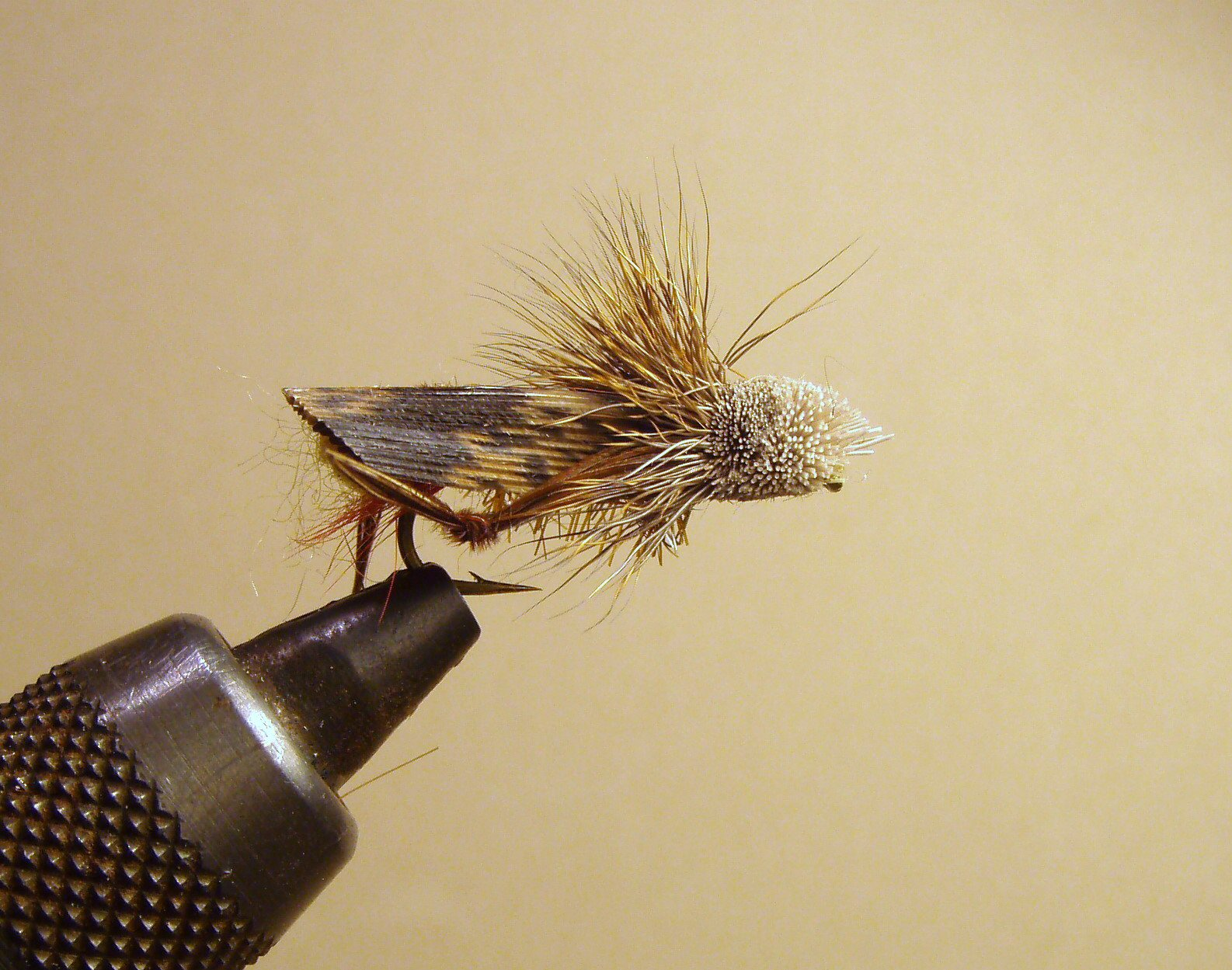
- Dave's Hopper
- Type: Dry fly
- Imitates: Grasshoppers, crickets

History
- Creator: Dave Whitlock
- Created: 1950s
- Variations: Dave's cricket (tied in black)

Materials
- Typical sizes: 6-14, 2X-3X long
- Typical hooks: TMC 200R, DaiRiki 700
- Thread: 6/0 nylon brown
- Tail: Red deer hair
- Body: Yellow wool or synthetic yarn
- Wing: Mottled turkey wing or tail
- Ribbing: Brown hackle
- Legs: Yellow grizzly hackle stems, knotted
- Collar: Deer hair tips
- Head: Spun and clipped deer hair

Uses
- Primary use: Trout, Panfish
- Other uses: Bass

Reference(s)
- Pattern references: Trout Flies-The Tier's Reference (1999) Hughes

Dave's Hopper is an artificial fly used for fly fishing, designed to imitate adult grasshoppers and other Orthoptera species. It is considered a dry fly terrestrial pattern. It was designed by fly tyer and angler Dave Whitlock, and combines the best aspects of Joe's Hopper and Muddler Minnow patterns.

== Origin ==
Oklahoma fly tyer Dave Whitlock conceived the Dave's Hopper in the 1950s when he was dissatisfied with the performance of the Joe's Hopper pattern popularized by angler Joe Brooks in his Trout Fishing (1958). Joe's Hopper (also known as the Michigan Hopper) was created in the 1920s by a Traverse City barber and fishing guide, Art Winnie. It was essentially the only hopper pattern being tied commercially in the 1950s. Joe's Hopper has a red hackle fiber tail and traditional rooster hackle for legs. Whitlock believed its biggest faults were its tendency to twist the leader and failure to float well for long periods. Whitlock's friend Joe Brooks suggested Whitlock use the Muddler Minnow as a hopper imitation instead. This inspired Whitlock to combine the best features of both flies, particularly the spun deer hair head, into the fly known as Dave's Hopper. The fly was originally tied without the yellow grizzly hackle stem legs. Fly tyer and fishing guide Jay Buckner of Jackson, Wyoming, suggested that Whitlock add these legs to the pattern to improve its performance.

== Imitates ==
The Dave's Hopper imitates adult short-horned grasshoppers (suborder Caelifera) of which there are thousands of individual species. Grasshoppers frequent grassy areas adjacent to rivers and lakes but are generally considered weak flyers. During windy conditions or when trying to cross bodies of water, they routinely land in the water and are consumed by fish. The Dave's Hopper is a generic terrestrial pattern designed to float and suggest a grasshopper that has just fallen into the water. They are most often fished close to banks and shorelines. They have proven to be an effective summertime and fall pattern for trout, bass and panfish anywhere grasshoppers are found.

== Materials ==
Dave's Hoppers are usually tied on 2X or 3X long dry fly hooks such as the TMC 200R and uses red deer hair for the tail. The body was originally tied with yellow wool yarn, but more modern examples use yellow synthetic yarn for better flotation. The body is ribbed with a brown rooster neck hackle. The wing is created from a section of mottled turkey tail or wing feather. The head and collar are created with spun and clipped natural deer hair. Legs are simulated with a yellow grizzly hackle stem that is knotted to resemble the large rear legs most hoppers have.

== Variations and sizes ==
Dave's Hopper's are usually tied in sizes 6 to 14 to represent the typical sizes of hoppers found throughout the summer and fall months. Dave Whitlock created the Dave's Cricket using the same basic tying technique and materials in black to simulate a typical cricket (Gryllidae). Dave's Hopper can be tied with a variety of colors for the tail, ribbing, body and deer hair head to represent different colored grasshopper species. Many tiers substitute rubber or pheasant tail feathers for the legs.
