= Spur (zoology) =

Anatomical term for an outgrowth of bone covered in a sheath of horn

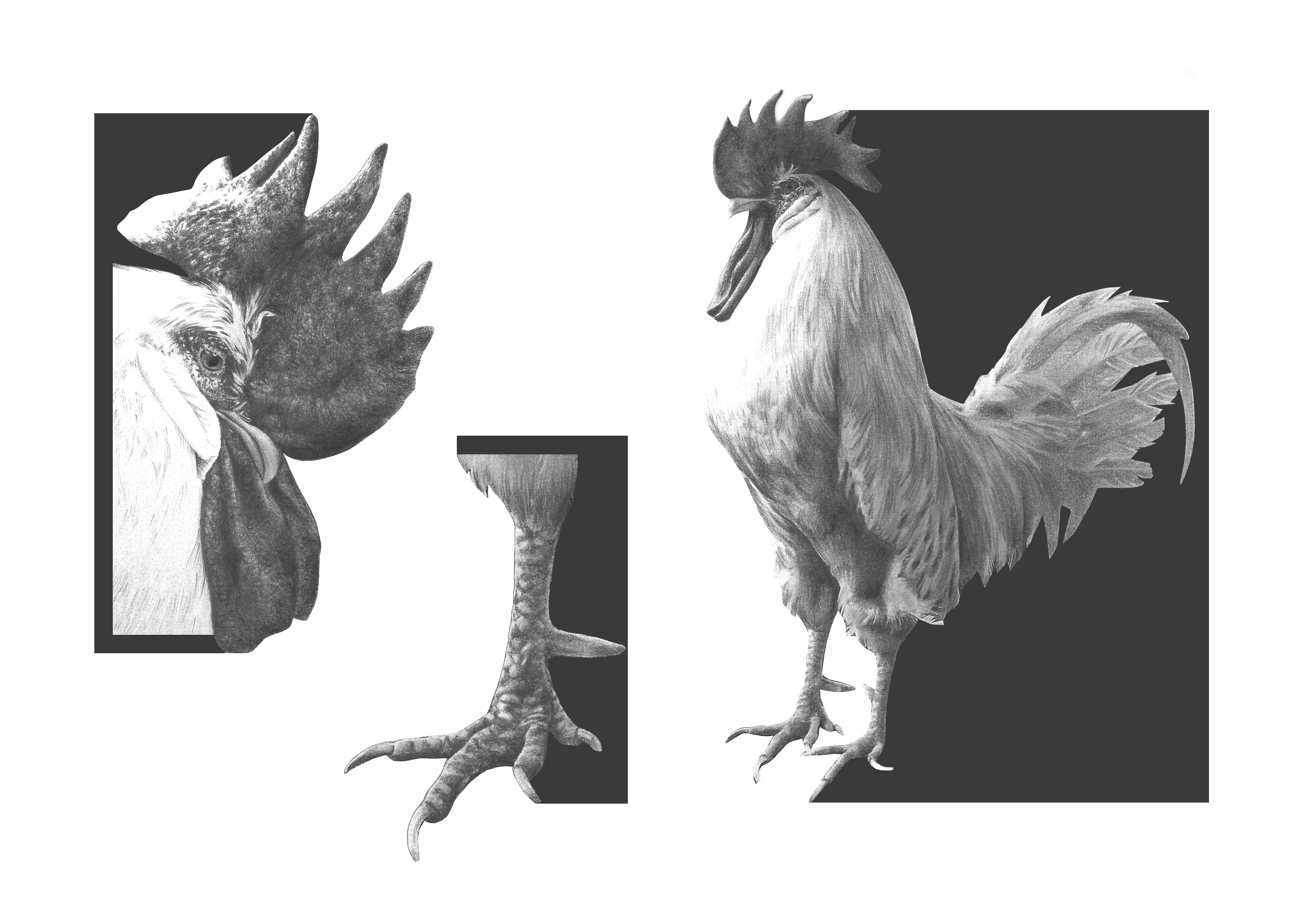
Rooster with spurs on the lower legs.

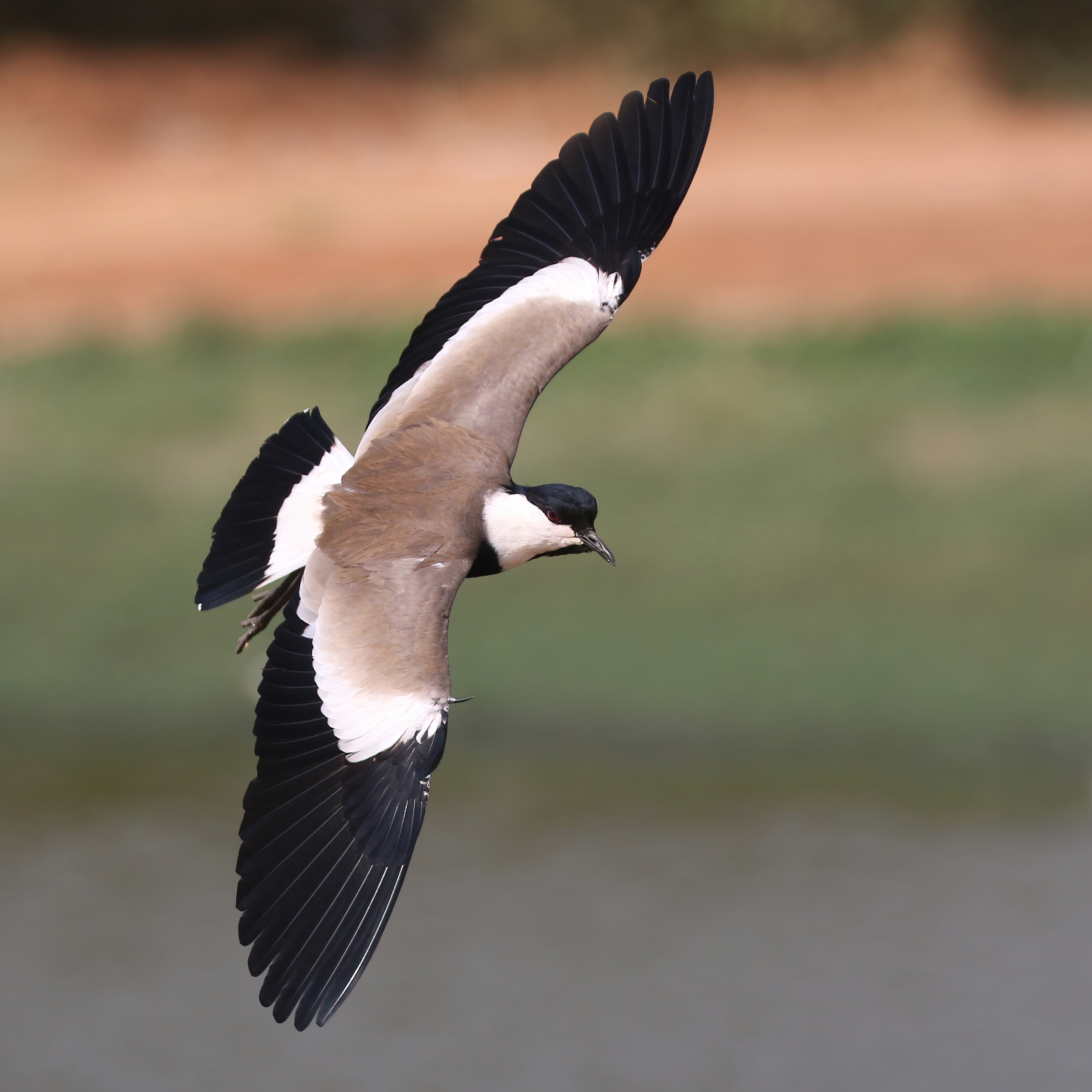
Spur-winged lapwing in flight with wing spurs clearly visible on the leading edge of the wings.

A spur is an outgrowth of bone covered in a sheath of horn found in various anatomical locations in some animals. Unlike claws or nails, which grow from the tip of the toes, spurs form from other parts of the foot, usually in connection with joints where the toes meet the foot or the foot meets the long bones. Spurs are most commonly found on the hindfeet, though some birds possess spurs at the leading edge of the wings.

== Anatomy ==
A spur is much like a true horn; it is a bony core attached to the skeleton and has an outer horny layer. Like horns, the spur grows from the base outwards, so the tip is older than the base. Some spurs form as an outgrowth of an existing bone, though most are secondarily formed as dermal bone hinged to the skeleton through a semi-rigid joint. Spurs on the hind-feet do not appear to molt, but the wing spurs of birds are molted once a year along with the wing feathers.

Unlike claws, spurs are normally straight or only slightly curved, making them suited to striking or stabbing. In birds and mammals, their function appears to be for fighting, defense and territory marking, rather than for predation. In reptiles, spurs are usually only found in the males and are used as holdfasts or to stimulate the female during copulation.

== In reptiles ==
The term spur is sometimes used to describe the pelvic spur, vestigial limbs found in primitive snakes, such as boas and pythons and in the striped legless lizard. The spurs primarily serve as holdfasts during mating. As these form at the terminal end of the limb, they may properly be claws rather than true spurs.

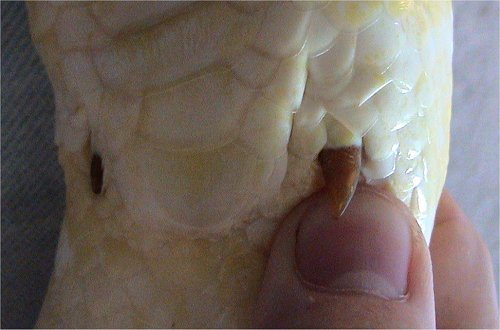
External view of anal spurs on a male, albino Burmese python.

The Boinae (a sub-family of boas) possess pelvic or anal spurs on each side of their cloaca. These spurs have a high degree of mobility and can be moved by appropriate musculature from their normal position lying along and against the body, into a perpendicular plane to resemble miniature legs. The pelvic spurs are usually held in the "erect" position and used by the male (at least) to stimulate the female. During mating, the male has a tendency to dig his pelvic spurs into the female's body. Whilst crawling over the female the male's spurs will scratch the surface of the female snake often making a distinct scratching sound. On other occasions, the male's spurs will move rapidly in and out, up and down, again to stimulate the female snake. This supports the theory that the pelvic spurs have a sexual role. In at least one species, the Madagascan boa (Sanzinia madagascariensis), the spurs are also used in combat where they are erected perpendicular to the body and flexed vigorously against the scales of the opponent. It has been claimed that pelvic spurs are retained parts of the pelvic girdle and are small, vestigial hind legs. However, it has also been claimed the spurs are modified scales and do not appear to be linked to any bone structure.

Male mating spurs are also found in most species of the chameleon genus Chamaeleo. A tarsal spur can be found on the back of the rear feet on male Veiled chameleons. This is present at birth and grows with age. It has been stated they are used in breeding.

In the striped legless lizard, the males can be distinguished externally from the females by spurs under each hind-limb flap. These flaps have been described as "...greatly reduced hind limbs".

Some tortoises in the genus Testudo also bear spurs, though these form on the femur rather than the foot. Unlike other spurs, they serve no obvious function. In the spur-thighed tortoise (Testudo graeca), both males and females have spurs. In a related tortoise, Hermann's tortoise (Testudo hermanni), neither the male or female have thigh spurs but both have a spur on the tip of the tail which is larger in the male.

== In birds ==
Most birds have four toes. The first points backwards in most species while the second, third and fourth digits point forwards. The fifth toe is lost completely except in some birds where it has become a spur. A number of birds have spurs on their feet or legs, usually formed from the lower portion of the tarsometatarsus bone. Best known are the spurs on chicken, though most galliform birds bear spurs. The spurs are mostly found in males, and used in mating competition or territory defence. Some birds have spurs on the wings rather than the legs. These are mostly found in both sexes and probably serve other functions, possibly defense.

Domestic chickens have metatarsal spurs which project from the axis of the metatarsus at an angle of about 90 degrees and are pointed posteromedially at about 45 degrees. They are placed between the middle and distal thirds of the metatarsus. Both hens and roosters can develop spurs, but they are more common and generally larger and better developed in roosters. Domestic and wild turkeys also have metatarsal spurs. In wild turkeys, the spurs continue growing through life and become longer and sharper. Spur length is generally considered to be the most reliable characteristic in determining the age of wild males. There are also differences in spur length between the different sub-species, probably due to habitat differences. Ocellated turkeys usually have the longest spurs; they generally live in swamps and areas with soft dirt and few rocks so they do not wear off the spur tips. Contrary to this, the western sub-species, like the Merriam's, often live in rocky areas which usually means even very old birds will have spurs that have been worn off to less than 2.5 cm long. During mating in domesticated hens and turkeys, the claws and spurs of the male may often scratch and injure the back and shoulders of the female. To prevent this, the females are sometimes fitted with "saddles" to protect them.

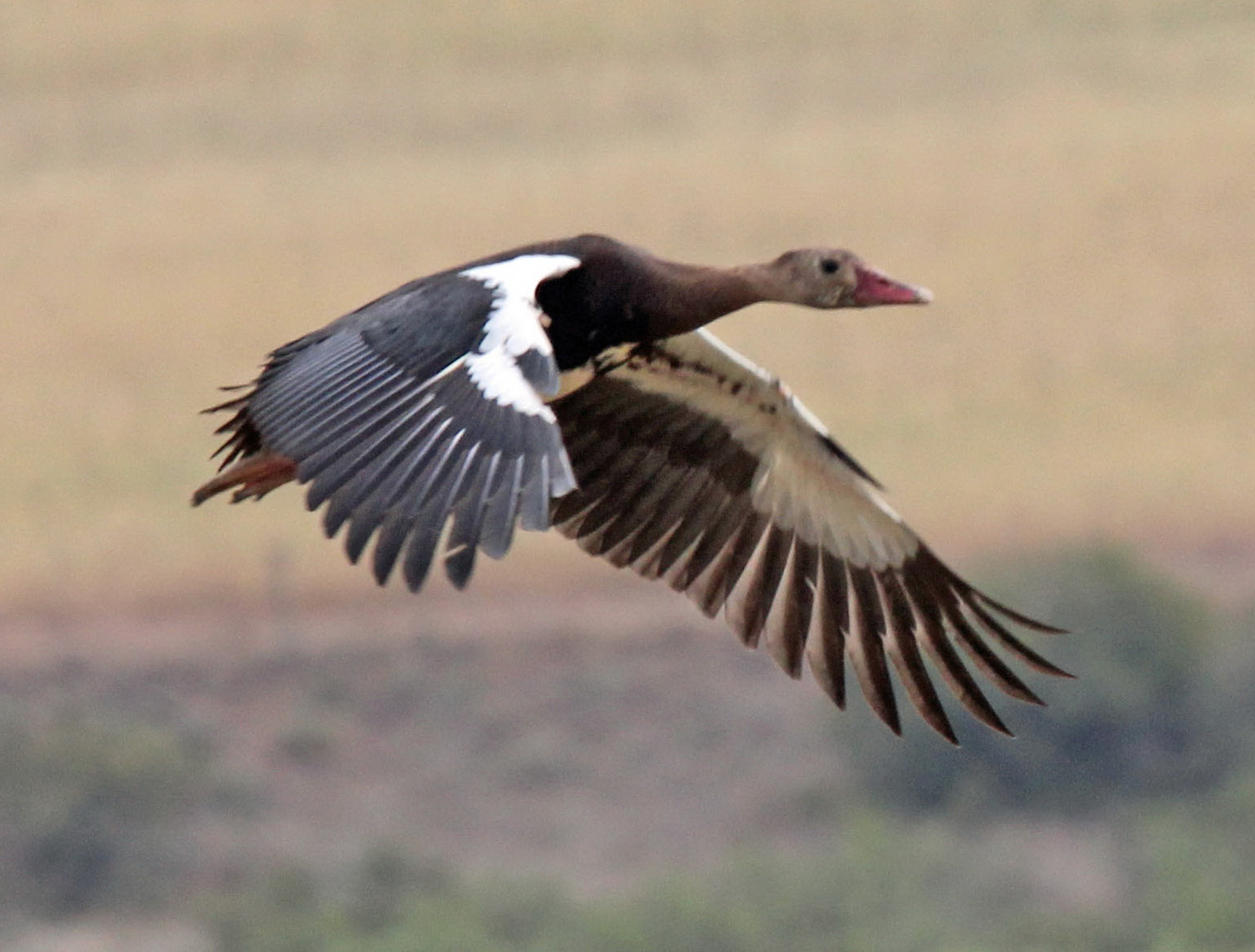
The spur-winged goose with visible carpal spurs.

The spur-winged goose (Plectropterus gambensis), the largest of Africa's waterfowl, has prominent carpal spurs which are not visible when the wings are folded. The spur is an extension of the radiale: one of the two distal carpal bones. It therefore has a completely novel origin compared to the spurs and spikes seen in screamer and other waterfowl. It is a stout, conical structure that is typically oval in cross-section, but sharp keels are present on the spur in some individuals. The genus name, Plectropterus, is from the Greek plektron, "a cock’s spur" and pteron, "feathers" or "wings". It has been claimed that the spur is used in defence against predators although they have also been described as "especially effective weapons" making this species "the most dangerous of all waterfowl". When disturbed, the male often stretches both wings over the back in the usual manner of a stretching bird. This behaviour brings into view the spurs and white wing patches, and may possibly function as a simple threat display. It has also been claimed that a number of other bird species are known to fight by hitting each other with their wings; some, including screamers, lapwings and spur-winged geese, "have evolved spurs to increase the damage they can wreak".

Screamers (Anhimidae) have two large spikes on the carpometacarpus. The larger one emerges from the extensor process, and a more distally located spur grows from near the end of the major metacarpal. In the black-necked screamer (Chauna chavaria) the spikes are oval in cross-section, but in the southern screamer (Chauna torquata) there is a sharp-edged keel along the spike's proximal edge, and in the horned screamer (Anhima cornuta) the spikes are triangular in cross-section with three sharp keels. In the black-necked screamer, the proximal spike can be 4.5–4.7 cm long, but in the male horned screamer it can reach 6.1 cm in length.

Carpal spurs are also present in the torrent duck (Merganetta armata). These are different from the carpal spurs of the spur-winged goose as they are borne on the extensor process. The torrent duck spur has a stout base and tapers quickly to a point. The spurs are typically bigger and more sharply pointed in males than females (0.9–1.7 cm compared to 0.6–1.3 cm). The species name for the duck means ‘armed’, suggesting it was named specifically for its spurs.

The masked lapwing (also known as the spur-winged plover) has carpal spurs. Nesting pairs defend their territory against all intruders by calling loudly, spreading their wings, and then swooping fast and low, and where necessary, striking at interlopers with their feet and attacking animals on the ground with the conspicuous yellow spurs. There is a much-believed but incorrect myth that the spur can inject venom. The myth may have been based on fear of the masked lapwing's territorial behaviour.

== In mammals ==
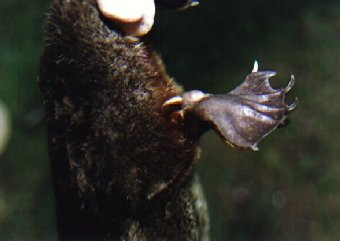
The calcaneus spur found on the male platypus' hind limb is used to deliver venom.

Spurs are uncommon in mammals.

The male platypus has well developed spurs on the heels of its hind feet. The spurs are hollow and connected to a venom gland, allowing the platypus to deliver a very painful kick both in mating competitions and as a defense. Similar, but non-venomous spurs are found in echidnas. Similar spurs have been found in the fossils of several early mammals, and is possibly the primitive condition in mammals as a whole.

The nail-tail wallaby (genus Onychogalea), as indicated by its common name, possesses a spur on the end of its tail.

The male ring-tailed lemur (Lemur catta) has spurs used in making visual/olfactory territorial marks. Both males and females have a scent gland on their inner forearm (antebrachial) approximately 25 cm above the wrist joint, however, in the males, this is covered by a spur. In a behaviour known as "spur marking", they grasp the substrate, usually a small sapling, and drag the spur over it, cutting into the wood and spreading the gland's secretions. When on the ground, ring-tailed lemurs preferentially mark small saplings and when high in the trees, they usually mark small vertical branches. The spur grows with age and seems to be developed from the secretions of the underlying gland, which may have up to 1,000 tiny ducts connecting through the skin.
