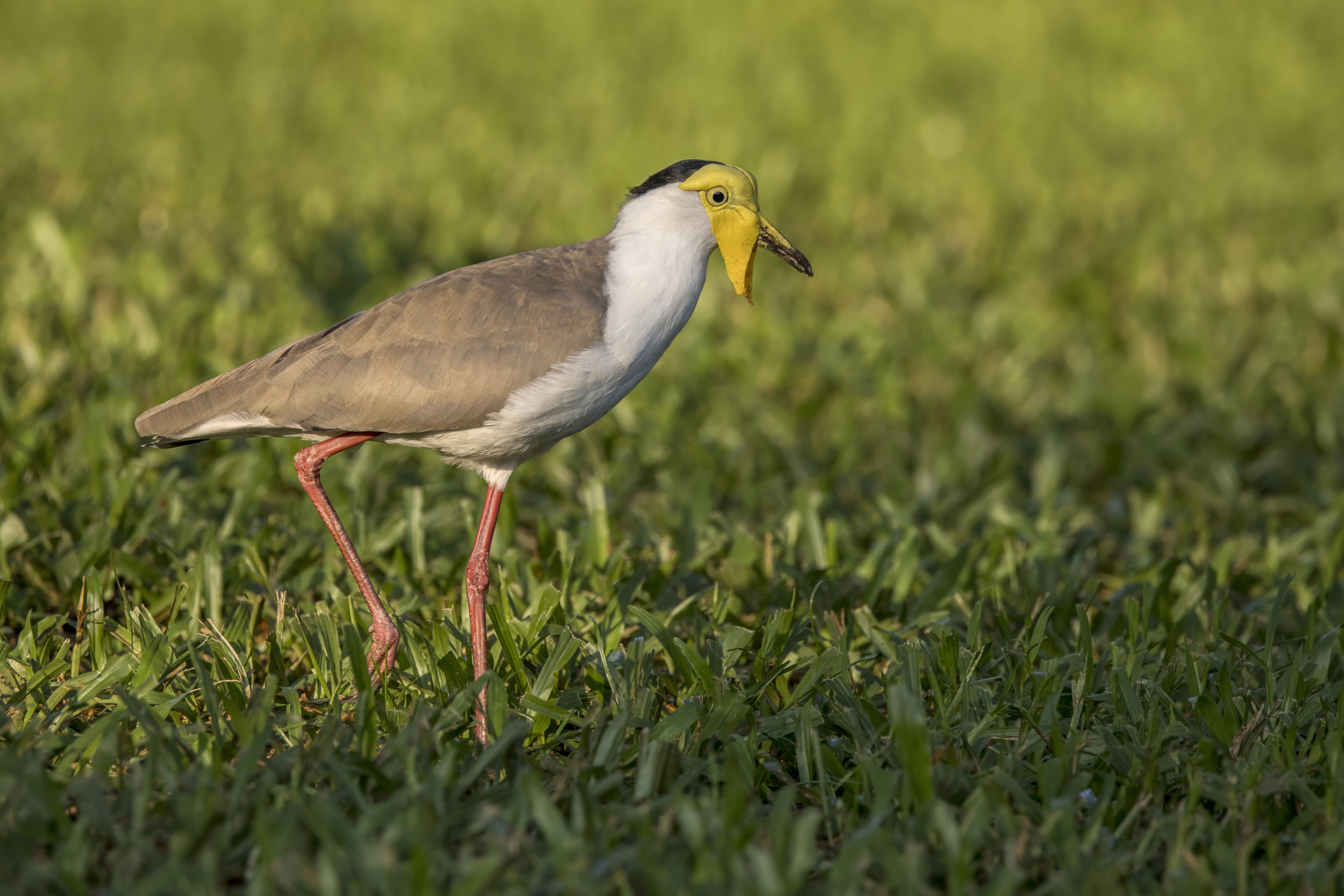
- V. m. miles Darwin, Australia
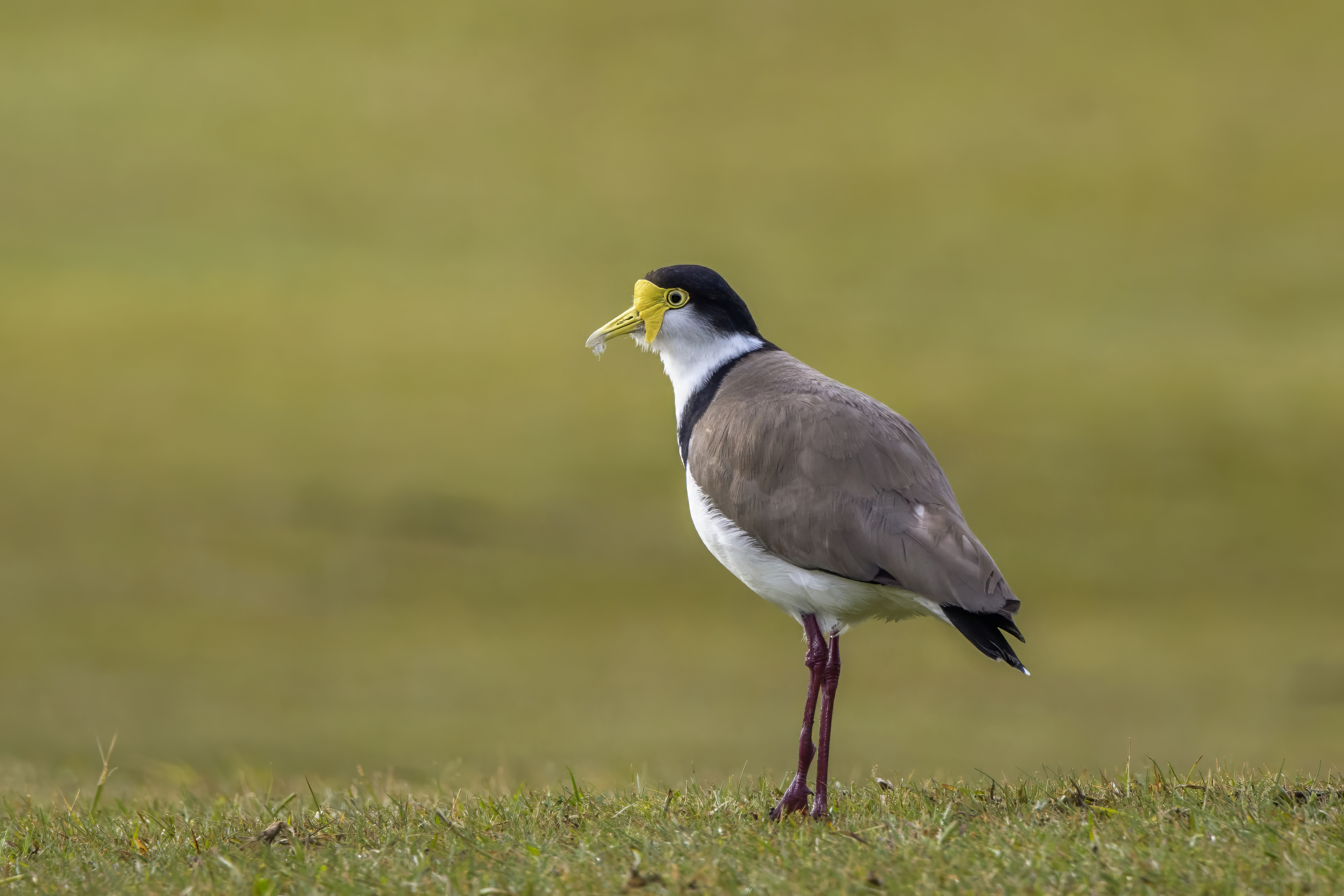
- V. m. novaehollandiae Waitakere Ranges, New Zealand

Conservation status
- Least Concern (IUCN 3.1) nominate subsp.

- Least Concern (IUCN 3.1) novaehollandiae subsp.

Scientific classification
- Kingdom: Animalia
- Phylum: Chordata
- Class: Aves
- Order: Charadriiformes
- Family: Charadriidae
- Genus: Vanellus
- Species: V. miles

Binomial name
- Vanellus miles (Boddaert, 1783)

Subspecies
- V. m. miles; V. m. novaehollandiae

Synonyms
- Hoplopterus miles (Boddaert, 1783); Lobibyx miles (Boddaert, 1783); Lobivanellus miles (Boddaert, 1783); Tringa miles Boddaert, 1783

= Masked lapwing =

Species of bird in the family Charadriidae

The masked lapwing (Vanellus miles) is a large, common and conspicuous bird native to Australia (particularly the northern and eastern parts of the continent), New Zealand and New Guinea. It spends most of its time on the ground searching for food such as insects and worms and has several distinctive calls. It is common in Australian fields, open land and where there is lots of water, and is known for its defensive swooping behaviour during the nesting season.

Despite the species being also known as the masked plover and often called the spur-winged plover or just plover in its native range, lapwings are classified to their own subfamily, Vanellinae, and not to the closely related plover subfamily, Charadriinae. There are two subspecies, the nominate subspecies and the southern V. m. novaehollandiae. The latter has distinctive black markings on the shoulder and side of the chest, and is sometimes recognised as a separate species, the black-shouldered lapwing (Vanellus novaehollandiae).

== Taxonomy ==
The masked lapwing was described by the French polymath Georges-Louis Leclerc, Comte de Buffon, in his Histoire Naturelle des Oiseaux in 1781. The bird was also illustrated in a hand-coloured plate engraved by François-Nicolas Martinet in the Planches Enluminées D'Histoire Naturelle. This was produced under the supervision of Edme-Louis Daubenton to accompany Buffon's text. Neither the plate caption nor Buffon's description included a scientific name but in 1783 the Dutch naturalist Pieter Boddaert coined the binomial name Tringa miles in his catalogue of the Planches Enluminées. The type locality was originally given in error as Louisiana. The locality was re-designated by the Australian ornithologist Gregory Mathews in 1912 as Timor Laut (the Tanimbar Islands). The current genus Vanellus was erected by the French zoologist Mathurin Jacques Brisson in 1760. Vanellus is the Modern Latin for a "lapwing". It is a diminutive of the Latin vanus meaning "winnowing" or "fan". The specific epithet miles is the Latin word for "soldier".

Two subspecies are usually recognised:

- V. m. miles (Boddaert, 1783) - Coastal New Guinea, Aru Islands, northern Australia
- V. m. novaehollandiae Stephens, 1819 - southern Australia, New Zealand. This taxon was formerly known as the spur-winged plover.

The Handbook of Birds of the World treats V. m. novaehollandiae as a separate species, the black-shouldered lapwing (Vanellus novaehollandiae), even though the two subspecies intergrade in northern Queensland and the Lake Eyre basin.

== Description ==
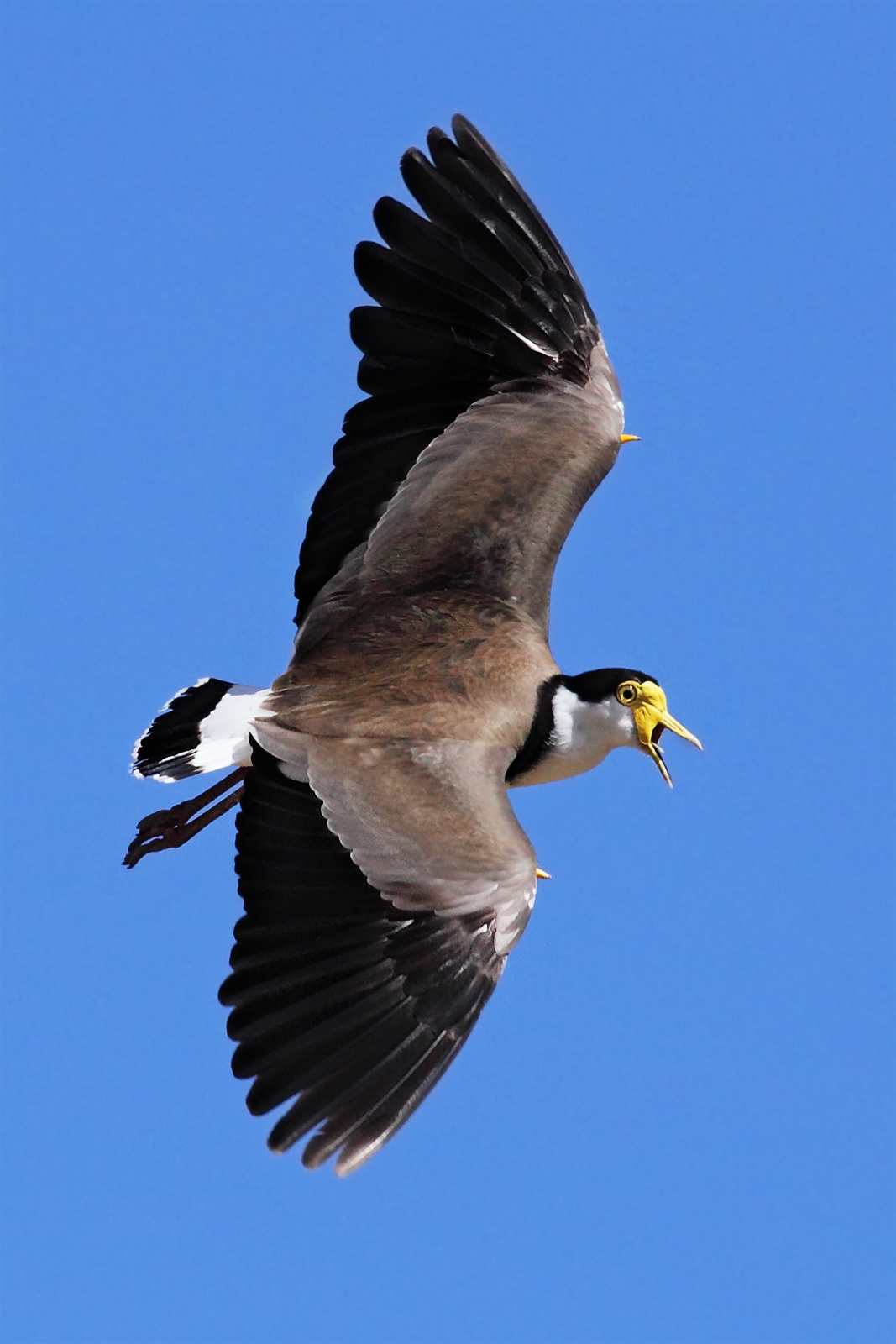
In flight with wing spurs clearly visible

The masked lapwing is the largest representative of the family Charadriidae. It measures from 30 to 37 cm (12 to 15 in) in length and has a wingspan of 75–85 cm (30–33 in), and has a conspicuous yellow spur on the carpal joint of each wing. The nominate subspecies (V. m. miles) weighs 191–300 g (6.7–10.6 oz), while the southern race (V. m. novaehollandiae) is larger and weighs 296–412 g (10.4–14.5 oz).

The subspecies from northern Australia and New Guinea (V. m. miles) has an all-white neck and large yellow wattles, with the male having a distinctive mask and larger wattles. The subspecies found in the southern and eastern states of Australia and in New Zealand (V. m. novaehollandiae), and often locally called the spur-winged plover, has a black neck-stripe and smaller wattles. (Note that the northern-hemisphere spur-winged plover is a different bird.)

The birds have a wide range of calls which can be heard at any time of the day or night: the warning call, a loud defending call, courtship calls, calls to its young, and others. Since the bird lives on the ground, it is always alert and, even though it rests, it never sleeps properly.

== Distribution and habitat ==
Masked lapwings are most common around the edges of wetlands and in other moist, open environments, but are adaptable and can often be found in surprisingly arid areas. They can also be found on beaches and coastlines. Vanellus miles novaehollandiae spread naturally to Southland, New Zealand, in the 1930s and has now spread throughout New Zealand, where it is recognised as a self-introduced native and known as the spur-winged plover.

== Behaviour ==
Masked lapwings are shy and harmless in summer and autumn but are best known for their bold nesting habits, being quite prepared to make a nest on almost any stretch of open ground, including suburban parks and gardens, school ovals, and even supermarket carparks and flat rooftops. They can be particularly dangerous at airports where their reluctance to move from their nesting area, even for large aircraft, has resulted in several bird strikes. Breeding usually happens after winter solstice (June 21), but sometimes before. The nesting pair defends their territory against all intruders by calling loudly, spreading their wings, and then swooping fast and low, striking at interlopers, if necessary, with their feet, and attacking animals on the ground with the conspicuous yellow spur on the carpal joint of the wing. The bird may also use diversion tactics against potential predators, such as fiercely protecting a non-existent nest, or a distraction display of hopping on a single leg, to attract attention to itself and away from its real nest, or from its chicks after they have commenced foraging.

There is a widely-believed myth that the spur can inject venom, however this is false. The myth may have been based on fear of the masked lapwing's territorial behaviour. Attacks are most vicious on other birds, such as ravens, and also on cats and dogs, but once the chicks reach 60% of full size after two or three months, the chances of that happening decrease. Strikes are much rarer on humans because they are more aware. Sometimes the bird can damage its wing in a strike but usually survives, although it is flightless while the wing heals. Some masked lapwings, especially those living in residential suburban areas, may never successfully breed, due to increased disturbance from domestic pets, people on footpaths, and cars. Commonly, two birds are seen together, a male and a female which are almost identical. They can be seen in groups at times, especially while feeding on coastlines. The chick reaches full growth after four or five months and will often stay with the parents for from one to two years, resulting in family groups of three to five birds nesting in one location over the summer. Their lifespan is approximately 16 years.

The birds spend much of the time on the ground, searching for worms and insects to feed on.

== Gallery ==
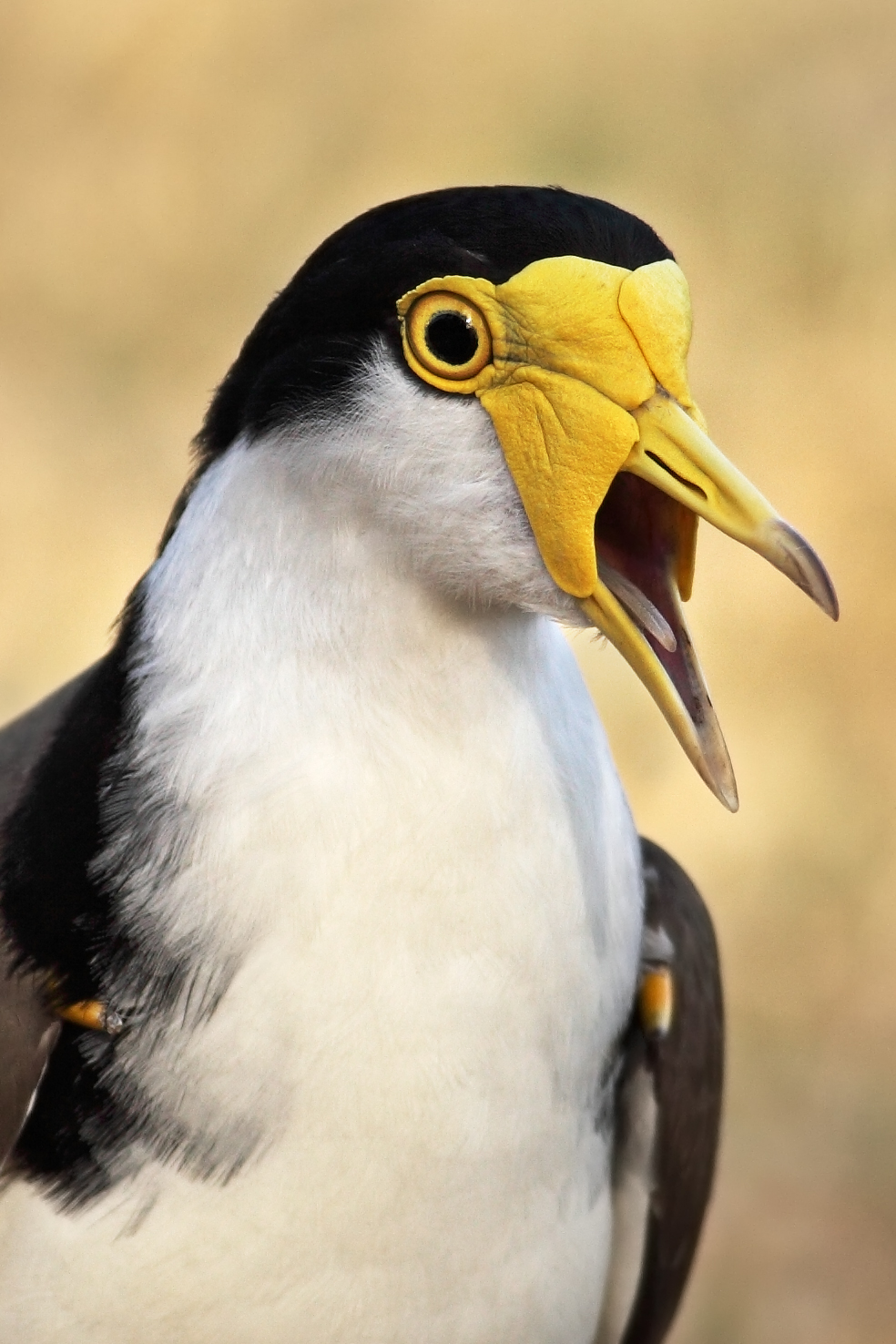
Southern race facial detail. Also shows wing spurs.

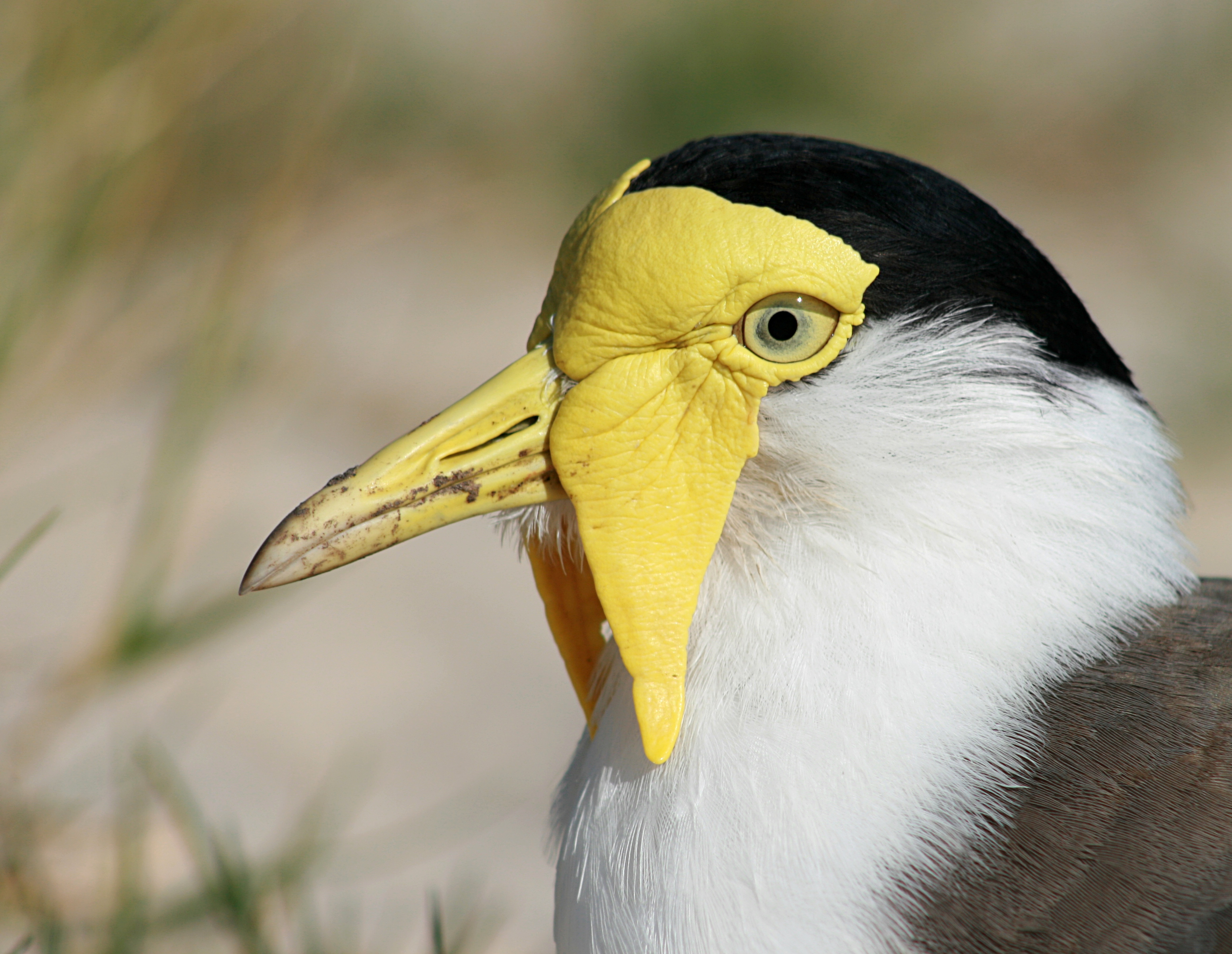
Northern race facial detail

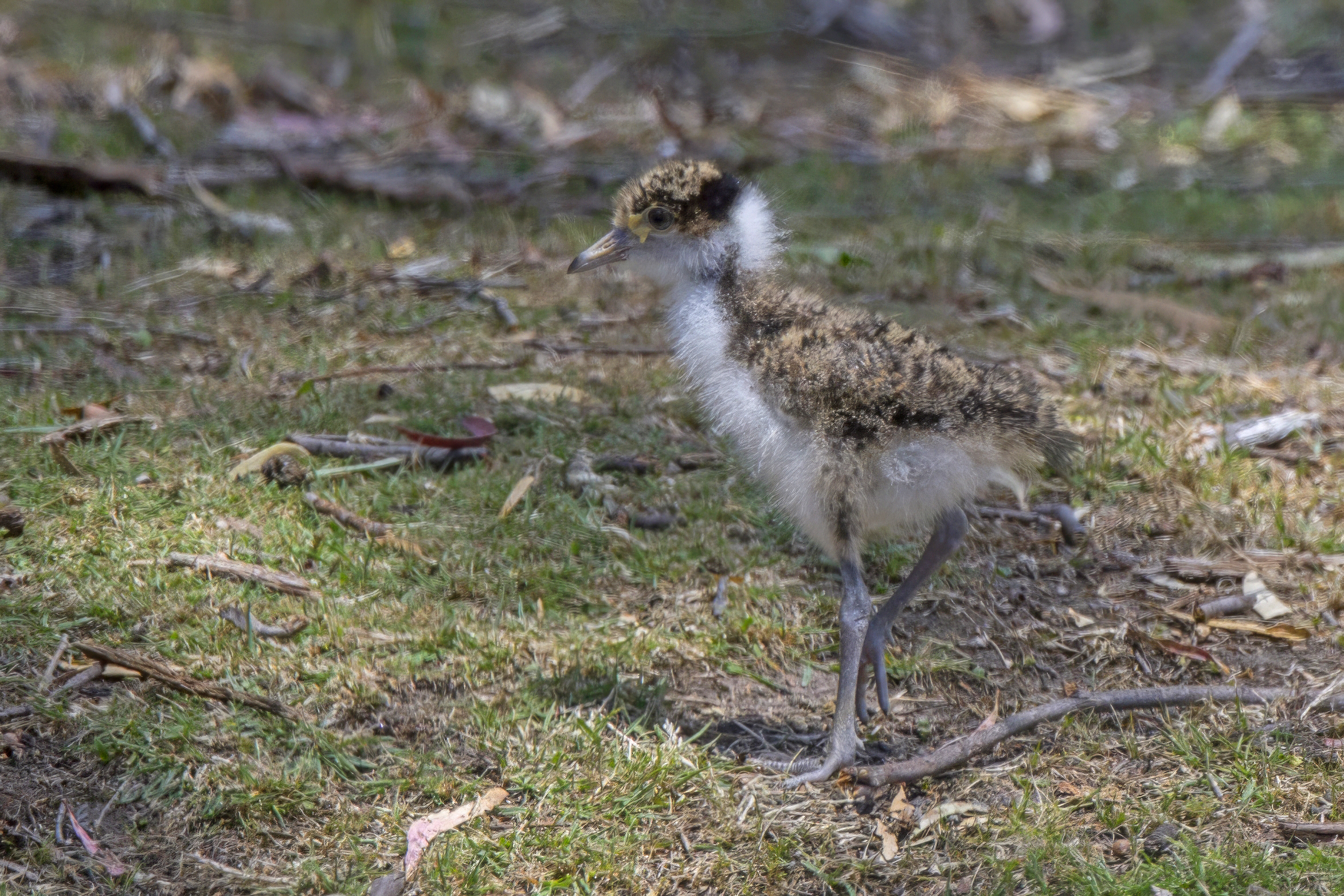
Juvenile

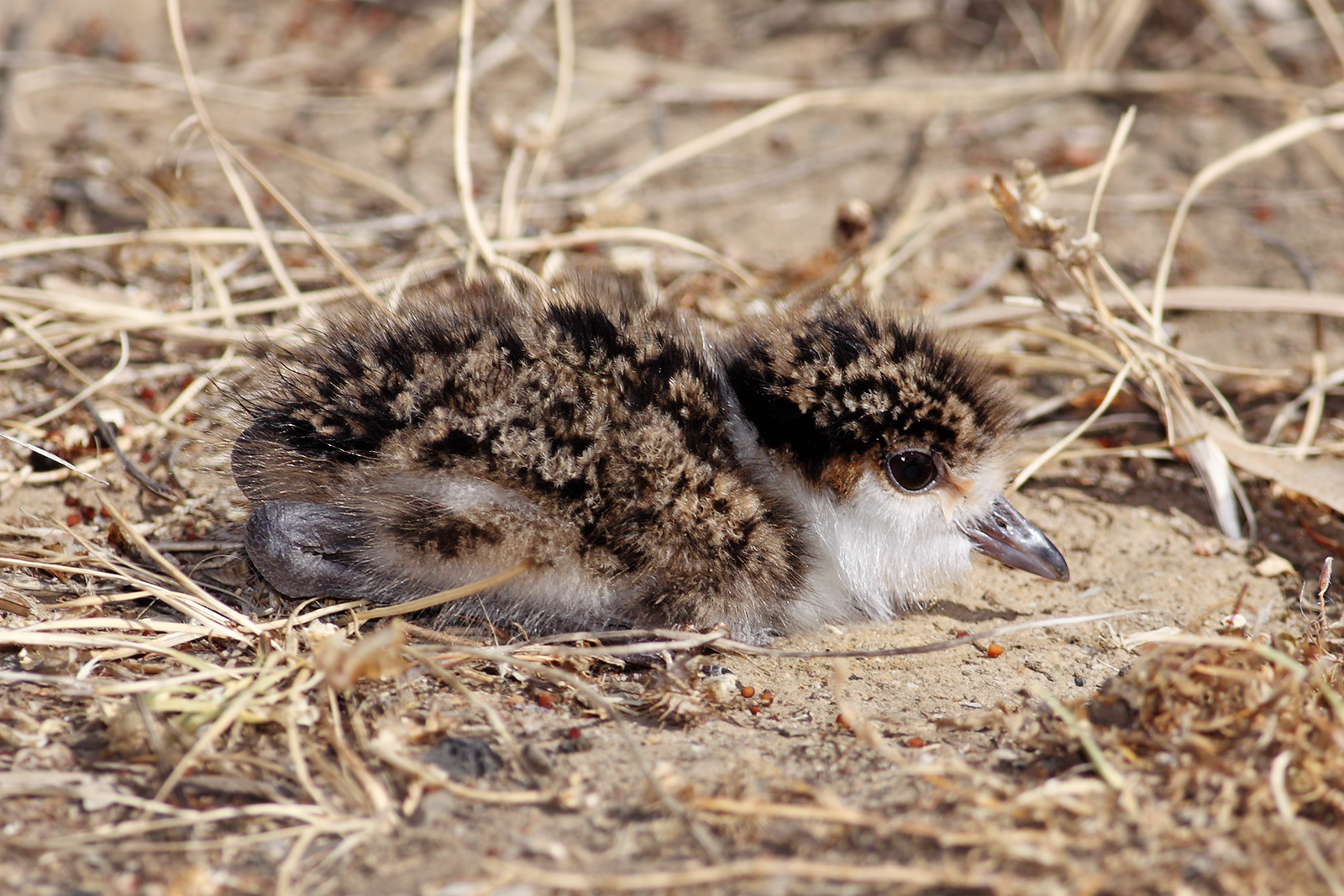
Chick in camouflaged posture

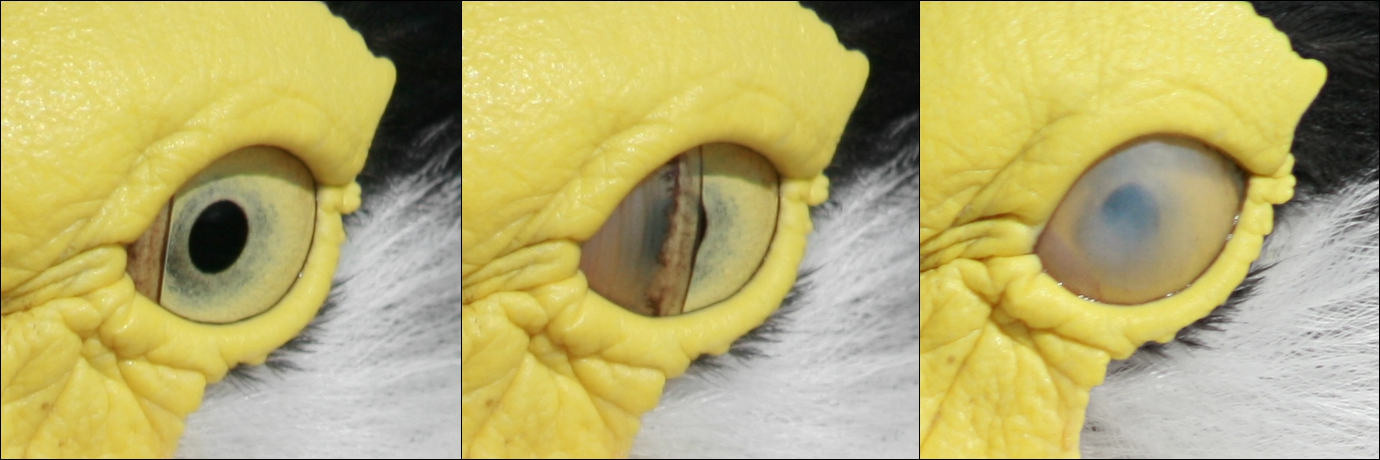
A masked lapwing blinking the left eye (the nictitating membrane is used rather than the eyelids). Note origin of the membrane from the medial canthus.

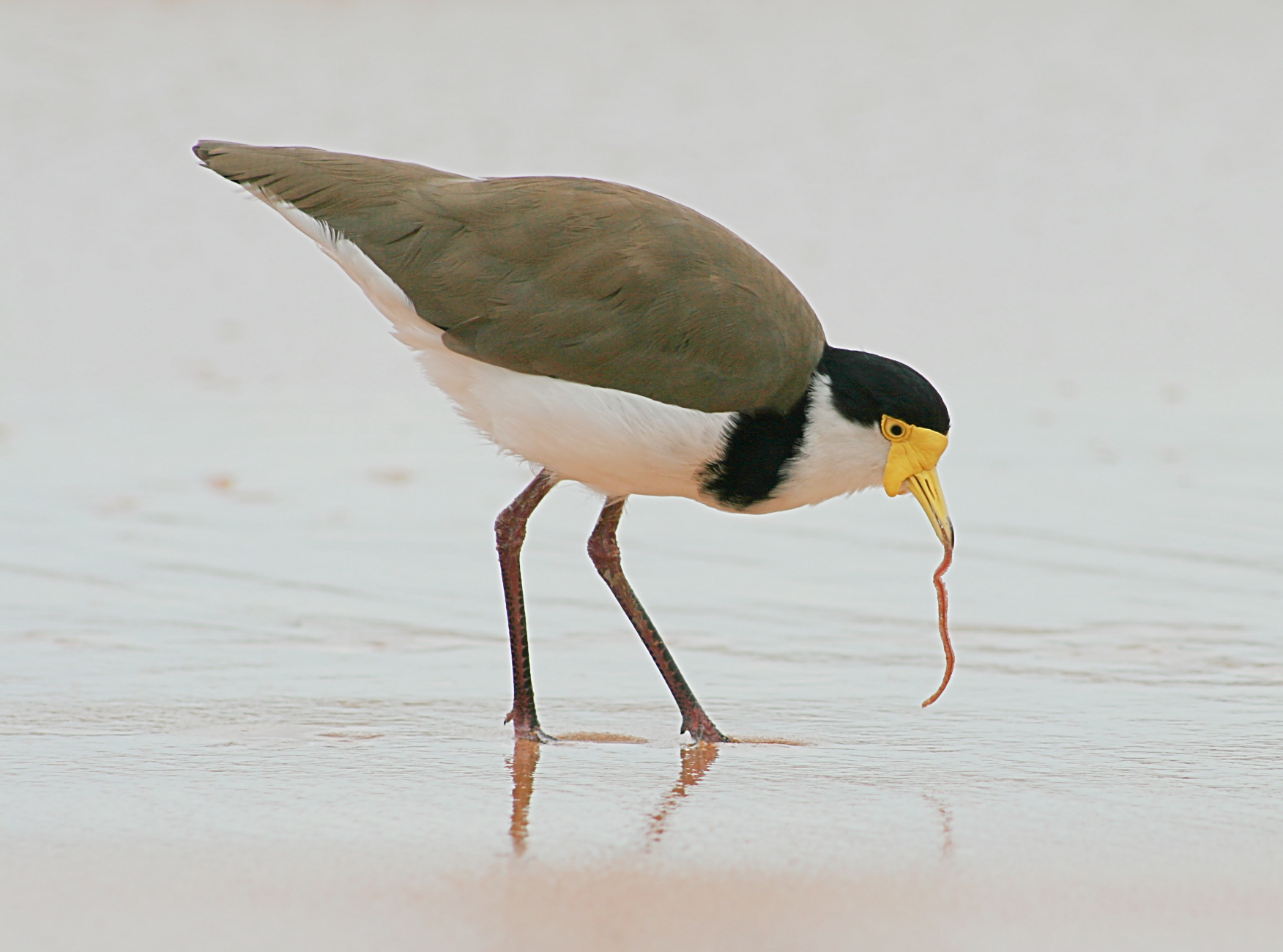
A masked lapwing feeding on a sand worm

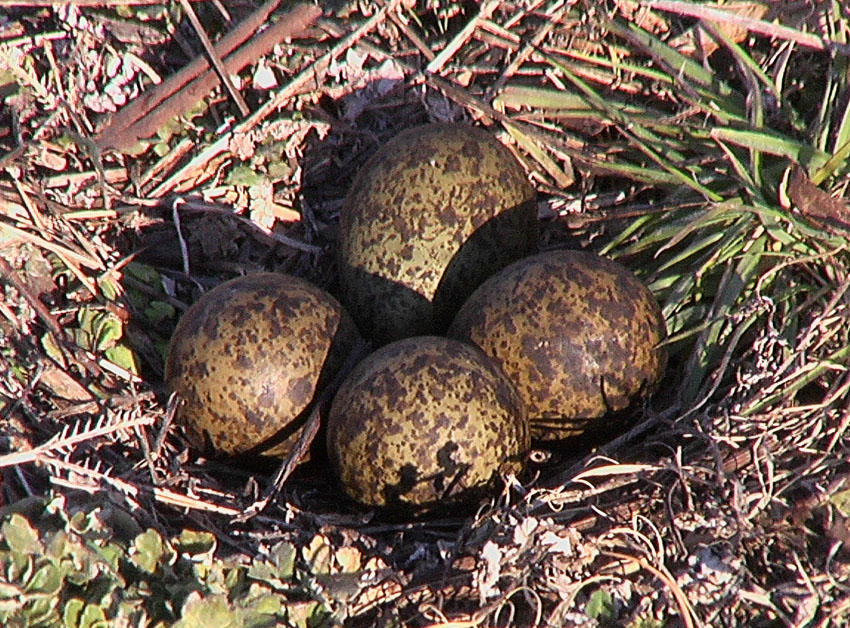
Eggs in a nest

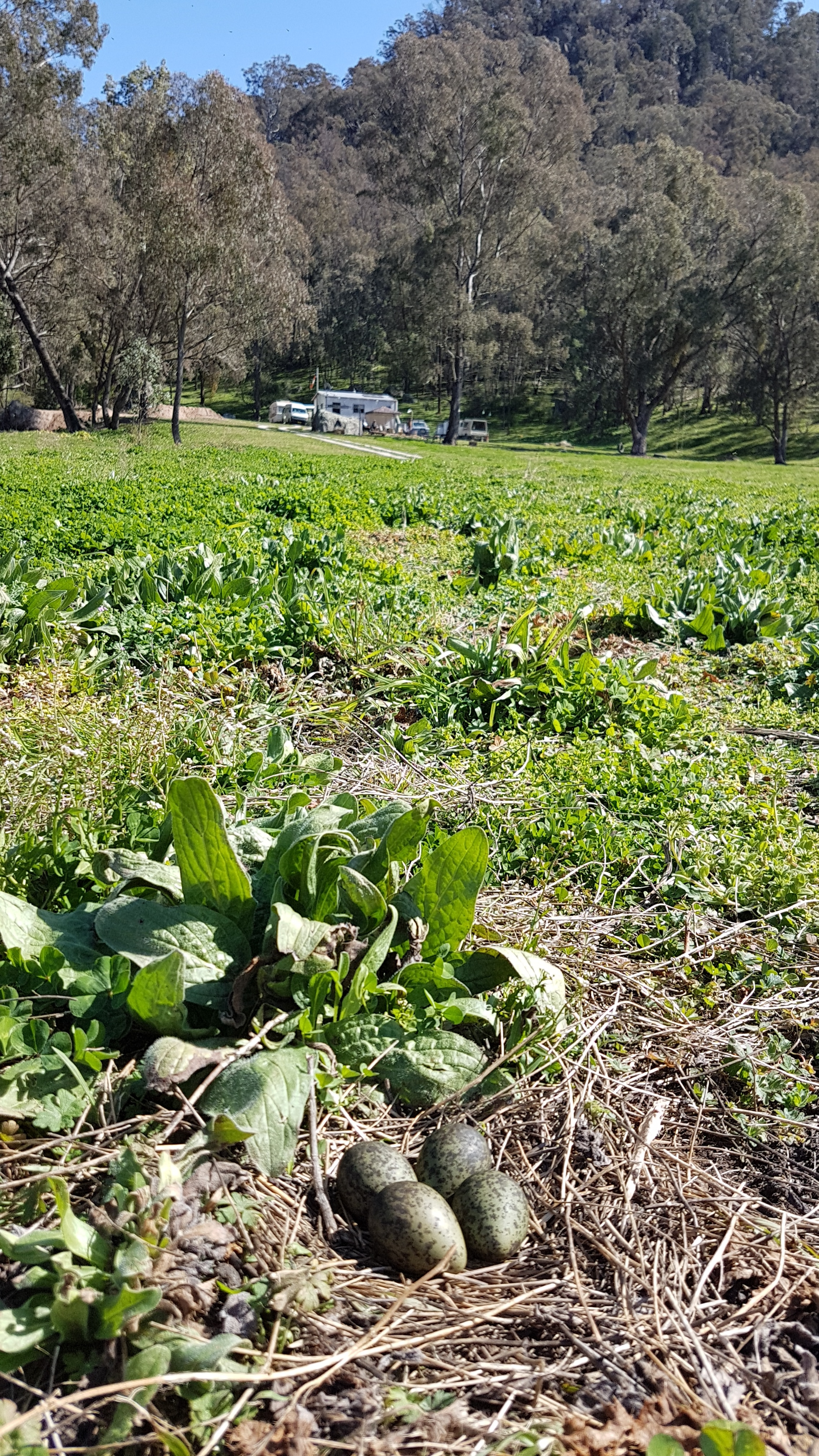
Typical situation
