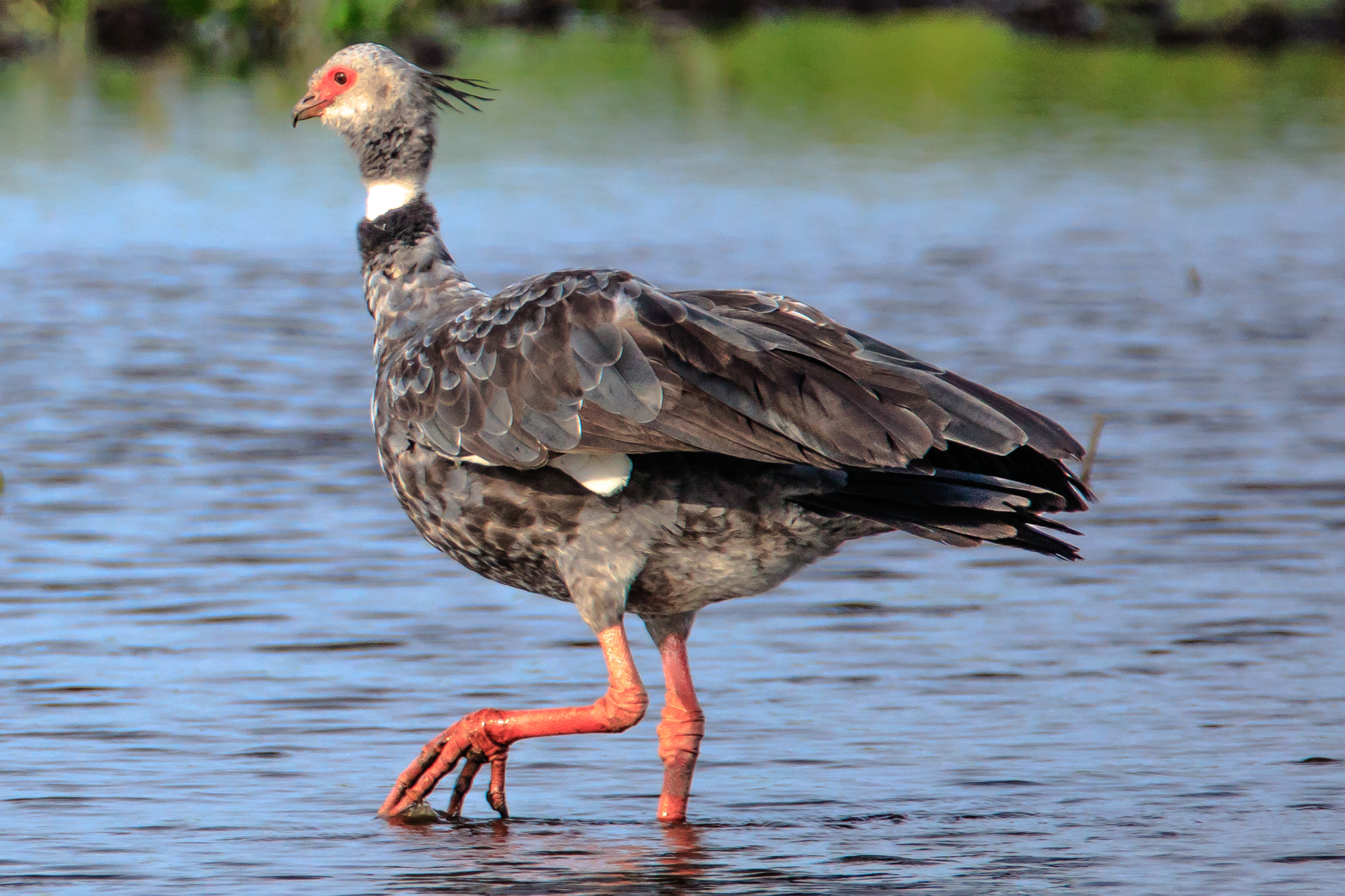
- Southern screamer (Chauna torquata)

Scientific classification
- Kingdom: Animalia
- Phylum: Chordata
- Class: Aves
- Order: Anseriformes
- Suborder: Anhimae; Wetmore & Miller 1926
- Family: Anhimidae; Stejneger, 1885

Genera
- Anhima; Chauna; †Chaunoides

= Screamer =

Family of birds

The screamers are three South American bird species placed in family Anhimidae. They were once thought to be related to the Galliformes because of similar bills, but are more closely related to the family Anatidae, i.e. ducks and allies, and the magpie goose, within the clade Anseriformes. The clade is exceptional within the living birds in lacking uncinate processes of ribs. The three species are: The horned screamer (Anhima cornuta); the southern screamer or crested screamer (Chauna torquata); and the northern screamer or black-necked screamer (Chauna chavaria).

== Systematics and evolution ==
Anhimids are most similar to presbyornithids, with which they may form a clade to the exclusion of the rest of Anseriformes. Given the presence of lamelae in the otherwise fowl-like beaks of screamers, it is even possible that they evolved from presbyornithid-grade birds, reverting from a filter-feeding lifestyle to an herbivorous one.

Screamers have a poor fossil record. Anachronornis from the Eocene of Wyoming was originally suggested to be a screamer but is now thought to be a basal anseriform, while the more modern Chaunoides antiquus is known from the late Oligocene to early Miocene in Brazil. Eoneornis from the Miocene of Argentina was originally described as an indeterminate anseriform but shows some similarities with Anhimidae, especially Chaunoides.

Image	Genus	Living species
	Anhima	Horned screamer, Anhima cornuta
	Chauna	Southern screamer or crested screamer, Chauna torquata; Northern screamer or black-necked screamer, Chauna chavaria

== Distribution and habitat ==
The three species occur only in South America, ranging from Colombia to northern Argentina. The horned screamer was once present on the Caribbean island of Trinidad, but is now extirpated from there. They are large, bulky birds, with a small downy head, long legs and large feet which are only partially webbed. They have large spurs on their wings which are used in fights over mates and territorial disputes; these can break off in the breast of other screamers, and are regularly renewed. Unlike ducks, they have a partial moult and are able to fly throughout the year. They live in open areas and marshes with some grass and feed on water plants. One species, the southern screamer, is considered a pest as it raids crops and competes with farm birds.

== Behaviour and ecology ==
Screamers typically lay 4–5 white eggs, with clutches ranging between 2 and 7. Like most Anseriformes, the chicks can run as soon as they are hatched. They can swim better than they can run, so young screamers are usually raised in or near water, where they can better avoid predators. Like ducks, screamer chicks imprint early in life. That, and their unspecialized omnivorous diet makes them amenable to domestication. They can be excellent guard animals, due to their loud alarm calls ("screams") when encountering anything new and possibly threatening.

== Status and conservation ==
Both the southern and the horned screamer remain widespread and are overall fairly common. In contrast, the northern screamer is relatively rare and consequently considered near threatened. They are seldom hunted, in spite of their conspicuous nature, because their flesh has a spongy texture and is riddled with air-sacs, making it highly unpalatable. The main threats are habitat destruction and increased intensification of agriculture.
