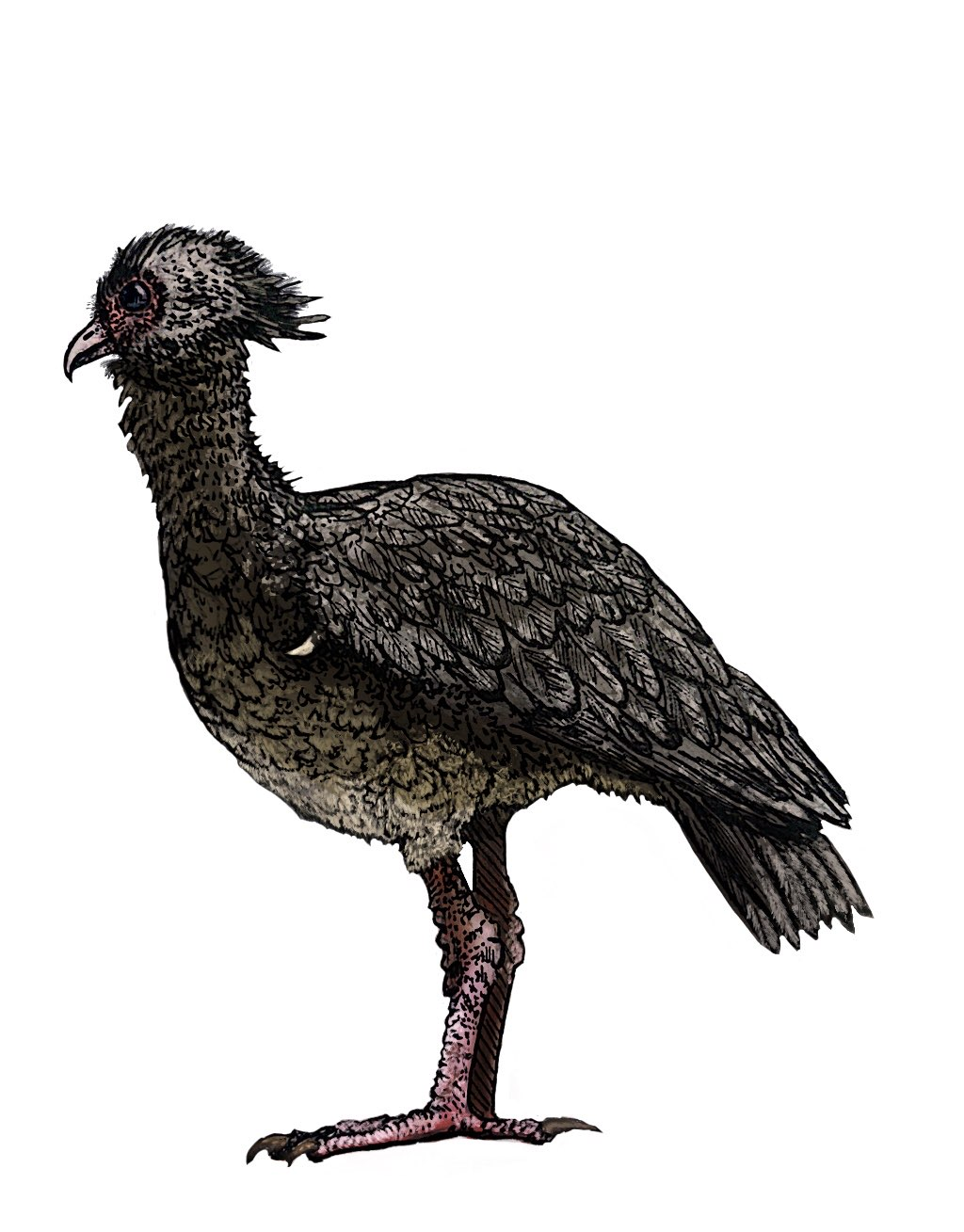

Scientific classification
- Kingdom: Animalia
- Phylum: Chordata
- Class: Aves
- Order: Anseriformes
- Family: Anhimidae
- Genus: †Chaunoides; Alvarenga, 1999
- Species: †C. antiquus

Binomial name
- †Chaunoides antiquus Alvarenga, 1999

= Chaunoides =

Chaunoides Temporal range: Miocene

Extinct genus of birds

Chaunoides is an extinct genus of screamer. Only one species of this genus is known, Chaunoides antiquus from the upper Oligocene or lower Miocene Tremembé Formation of Brazil. It was smaller and more gracile than all living screamers.

== Description ==
Chaunoides is a small screamer, but still large when compared to most living ducks and geese. Its legs are similar in length to the other species of screamer, but thinner and less pneumatized, consistent with a more gracile body. The skeletal material is relatively fragmentary, including only a coracoid and fragmentary limb material. Like the femur, many of the skeletal elements of Chaunoides are less pneumatized than the living screamers. The coracoid is more slender than any living screamer, and smaller overall. Conclusive reconstructions or size estimates of the entire animal are difficult due to a lack of available fossil material.

== Paleoecology ==
The Tremembe Formation is a small lacustrine deposit composed mainly of Clay and Shale. Chaunoides coexisted with a wide variety of other bird species, including the extinct flamingos Palaelodus and Agnopterus, as well as the Teratorn Taubatornis. Pyrotherian mammals are also known from the site. The preserved lake ecosystem was alkaline and shallow.
