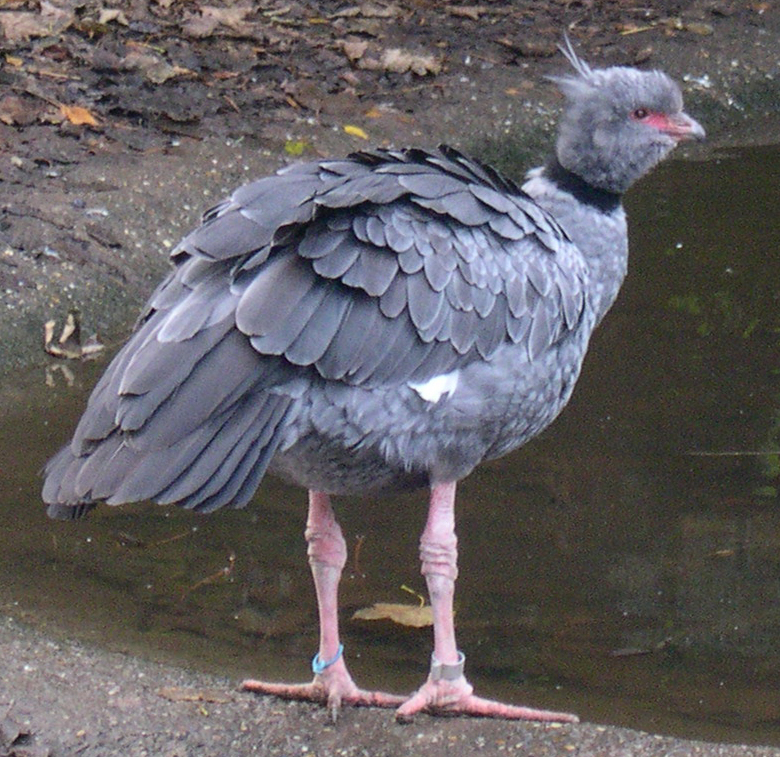
- Southern screamer (Chauna torquata)

Scientific classification
- Kingdom: Animalia
- Phylum: Chordata
- Class: Aves
- Order: Anseriformes
- Family: Anhimidae
- Genus: Chauna; Illiger, 1811

Type species
- Parra chavaria Linnaeus, 1766

Species
- Chauna chavaria Chauna torquata

= Chauna =

Genus of birds

Chauna is a genus of birds in the screamer family. Its two members are found in wetlands of South America.

== Description ==
They are large, bulky birds, with a small downy head, long legs and large feet which are only partially webbed. They have large spurs on their wings which are used in fights over mates and territorial disputes.

== Conservation ==
The southern screamer is overall fairly common and sometimes considered a pest as it raids crops and competes with farm birds for food. In contrast, the northern screamer is relatively rare and therefore considered near threatened.

== Species ==
Genus Chauna – Illiger, 1811 – two species
Common name	Scientific name and subspecies	Range	Size and ecology	IUCN status and estimated population
Southern screamer or crested screamer	Chauna torquata (Oken, 1816)	southeastern Peru, northern Bolivia, Paraguay, southern Brazil, Uruguay and northern Argentina	Size: Habitat: Diet:	LC
Northern screamer or black-necked screamer	Chauna chavaria (Linnaeus, 1766)	northern Colombia, in Chocó, Antioquia, Córdoba, Sucre, Bolívar, Magdalena, Santander, and Cesar Departments and northwestern Venezuela, in Zulia, Mérida, and Trujillo States.	Size: Habitat: Diet:	NT
