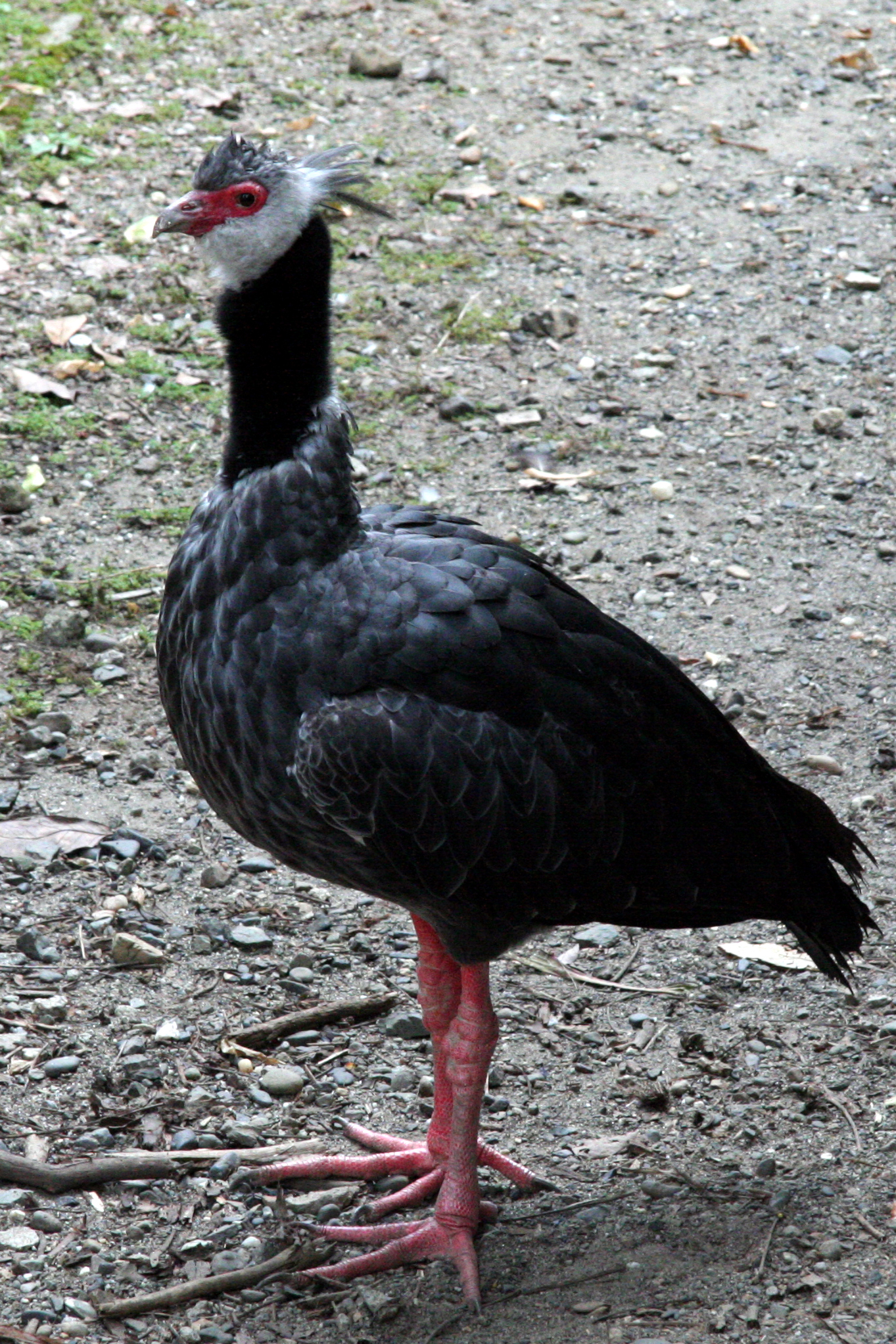

Conservation status
- Least Concern (IUCN 3.1)

Scientific classification
- Kingdom: Animalia
- Phylum: Chordata
- Class: Aves
- Order: Anseriformes
- Family: Anhimidae
- Genus: Chauna
- Species: C. chavaria

Binomial name
- Chauna chavaria (Linnaeus, 1766)
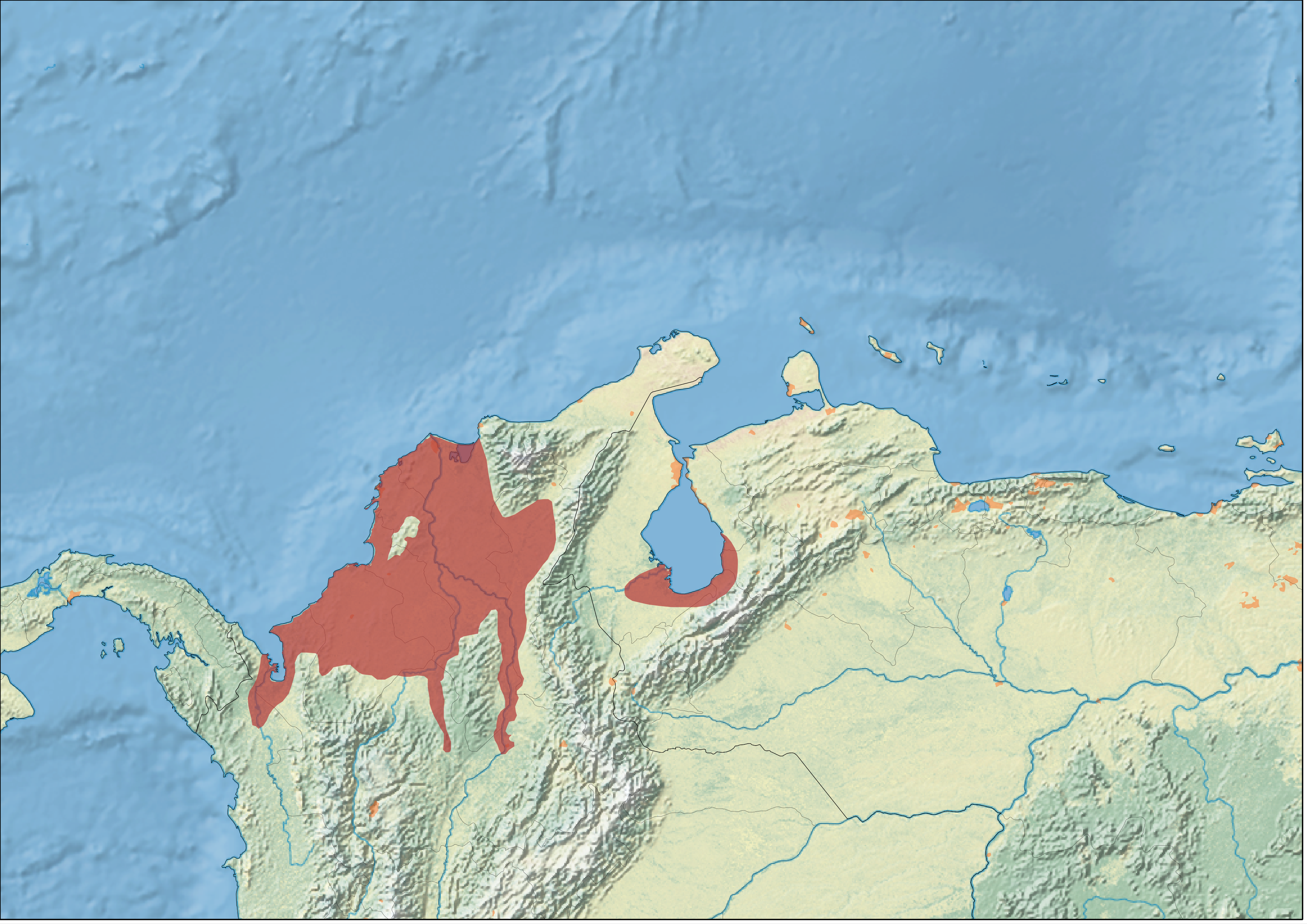
- Distribution map

Synonyms
- Parra chavaria Linnaeus, 1766

= Northern screamer =

Species of bird

The northern screamer (Chauna chavaria) is a species of bird in family Anhimidae of the waterfowl order Anseriformes. It is found in Colombia and Venezuela.

== Taxonomy and systematics ==
The northern screamer shares genus Chauna with the southern screamer (C. torquata). One other species, the horned screamer (Anhima cornuta) is also in family Anhimidae. The northern screamer is monotypic.

== Description ==
The northern screamer is 76 to 91 cm (30 to 36 in) long. They are stout bodied with a disproportionately small head and a gray bill. The sexes have the same plumage. Adults have a gray crown with a long crest, a mostly white face, a wide black band around the neck, and a dark gray body, wings, and tail. Their wing has two sharp spurs at its manus. They have bare red skin around their brown eye and reddish orange legs and feet. Juveniles are similar to adults but drabber.

== Distribution and habitat ==
The northern screamer is found across northern Colombia from the Atrato River and Magdalena River valleys east into the Lake Maracaibo area of Venezuela. It inhabits a variety of wet landscapes including swamps, marshes, lagoons, riverbanks, and seasonally flooded river plains.

== Behavior ==
=== Movement ===
The northern screamer is essentially sedentary but local wandering by non-breeders and juveniles is suspected.

=== Feeding ===
The northern screamer feeds on the leaves, stems, and roots of aquatic plants. They usually graze like geese, sometimes in loose flocks.

=== Breeding ===
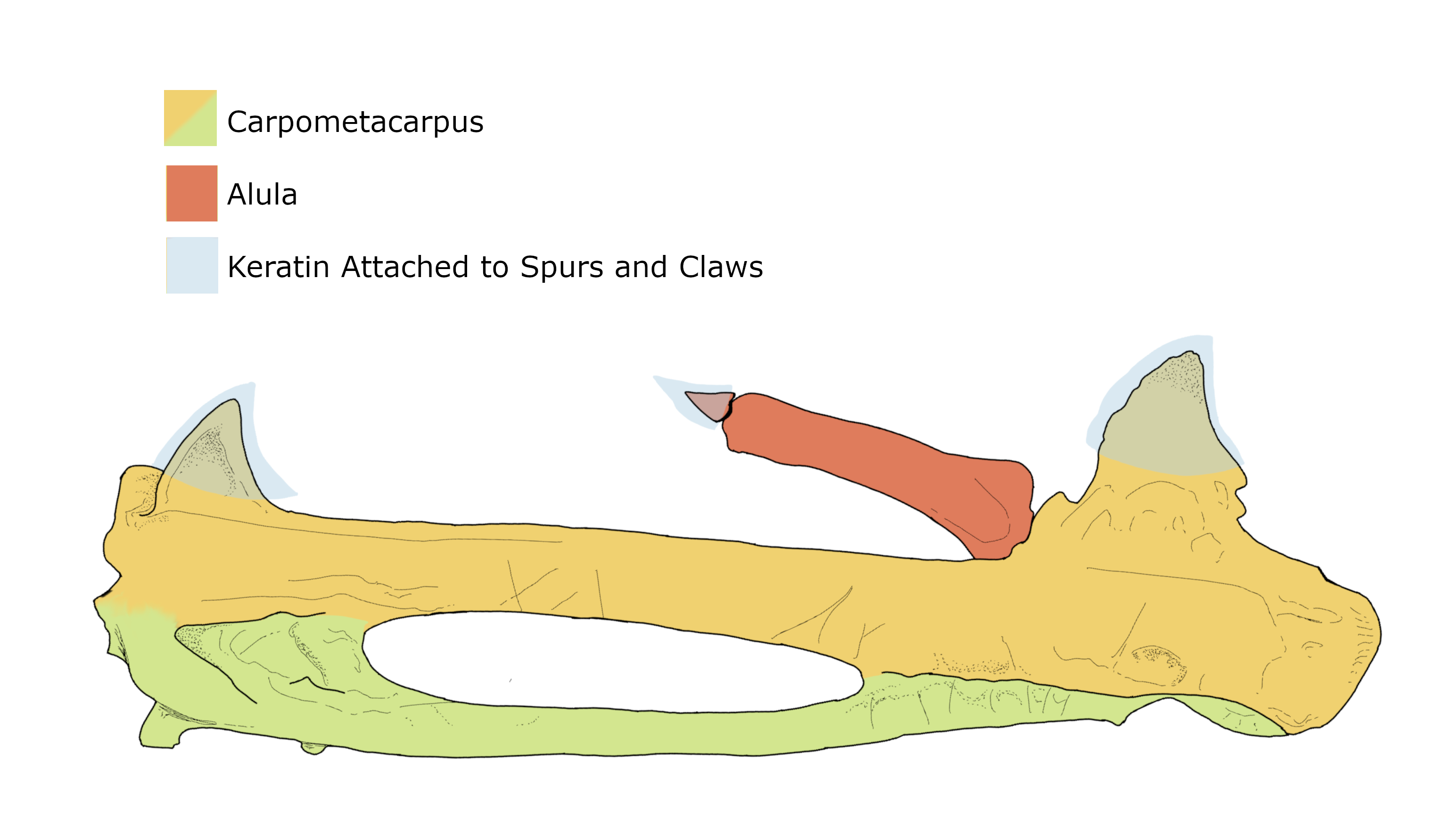
Diagram of the carpometacarpus of Chauna chavaria, the bone which both manual spurs are attached to. The carpometacarpus consists of several fused bones from both the second digit (yellow) and the third digit (green) of the manus. Keratin caps (blue) cover the spurs and the thumb claw (red).

The northern screamer is territorial during the breeding season. The pair build a mound of plant material and debris as a nest. Breeding can be at any time of year but most eggs are laid in October and November. The typical clutch size is three to five eggs but can be up to seven. Both parents incubate the eggs and care for the young. The incubation period is 42 to 44 days; fledging occurs eight to ten weeks after hatch and the young are independent after about 12 weeks.

=== Vocalization ===
The northern screamer, like others of its family, is very vocal. Its primary vocalization is a "single, rather high-pitched yelping call...'kleer-a-ruk, cherio'."

== Status ==
The IUCN originally assessed the northern screamer as Threatened. Between 2004 and 2023 treated it as Near Threatened. It was believed to have a somewhat limited range with an estimated population of between 1500 and 7000 mature individuals. A more recent IUCN Assessment reassigned the bird to a species of Least Concern, believing previously reported population sizes to be underestimates – estimated population is now reported as 60,000-130,000 mature individuals. It occurs in several protected areas in Colombia but even they have suffered from habitat destruction. The species is also affected by egg collecting and hunting for food, domestic and industrial pollution of its habitat, and urbanization.
