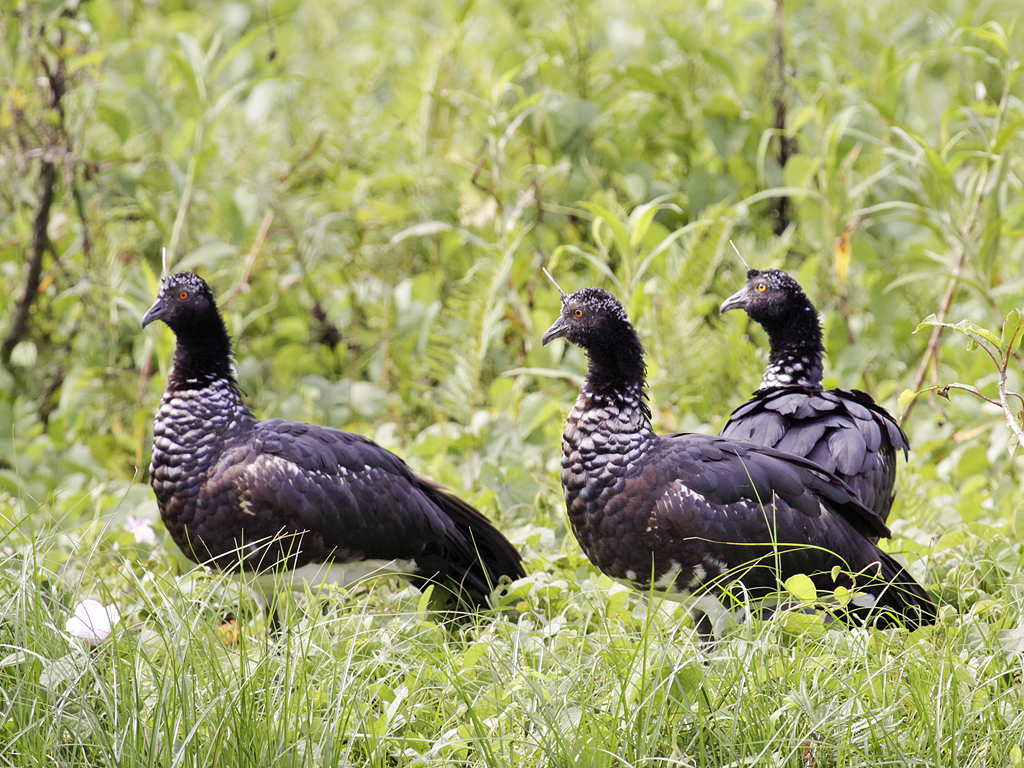
- Three in Manu National Park, Peru Horned Screamer calls, recorded in Amacayacu National Park, Colombia

Conservation status
- Least Concern (IUCN 3.1)

Scientific classification
- Kingdom: Animalia
- Phylum: Chordata
- Class: Aves
- Order: Anseriformes
- Family: Anhimidae
- Genus: Anhima; Brisson, 1760
- Species: A. cornuta

Binomial name
- Anhima cornuta (Linnaeus, 1766)
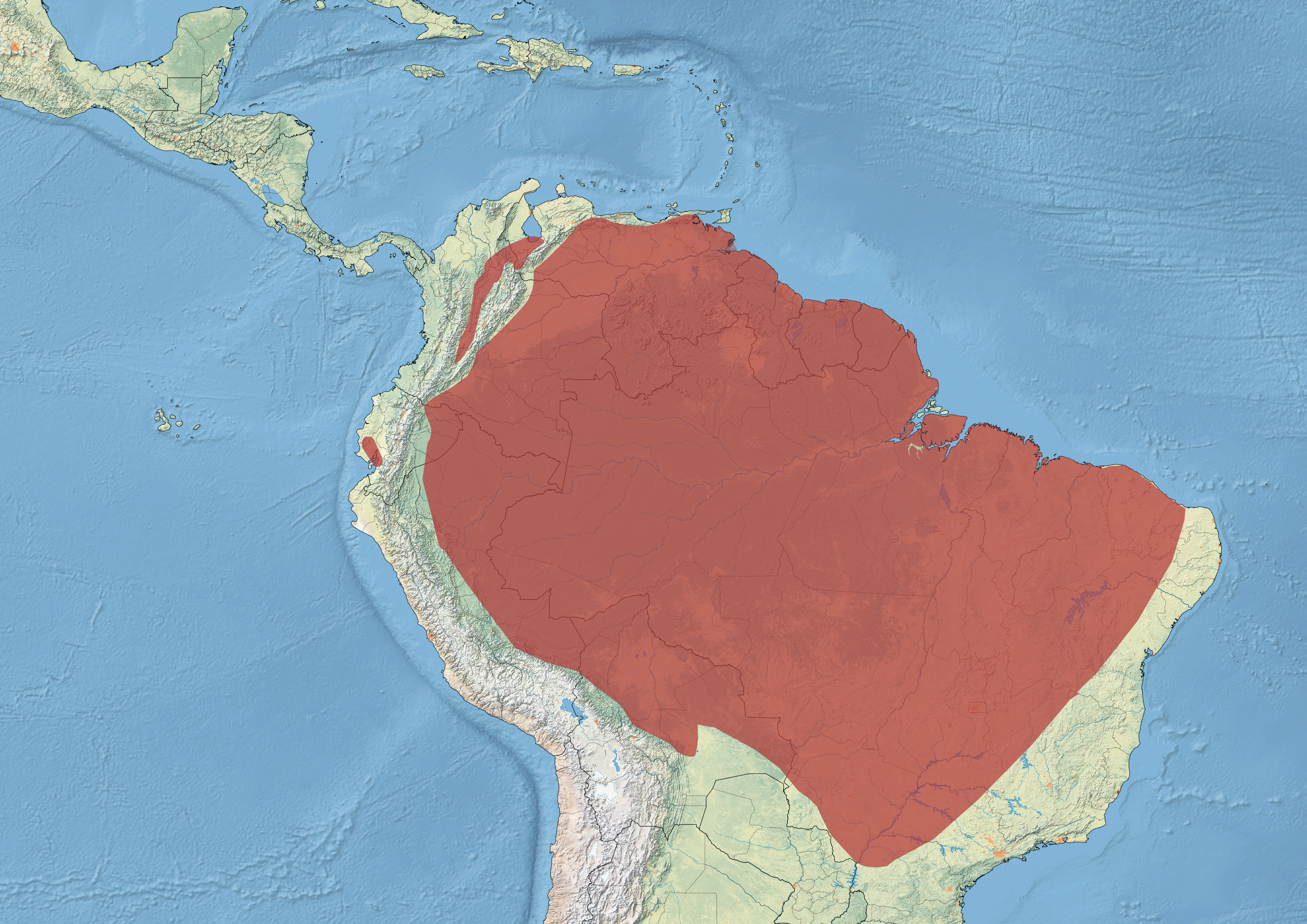
- Distribution map

Synonyms
- Palamedea cornuta Linnaeus, 1766

= Horned screamer =

Species of waterfowl

The horned screamer (Anhima cornuta) is a species of waterfowl that belongs to a relatively small family, the Anhimidae, which occurs in wetlands of tropical South America. There are three screamer species, the other two being the southern screamer and the northern screamer in the genus Chauna. They are related to ducks, geese and swans, which are in the family Anatidae, but have bills looking more like those of Galliformes.

== Taxonomy ==
Already known in the 17th century, the horned screamer was described in 1766 by the Swedish naturalist Carl Linnaeus in the twelfth edition of his Systema Naturae. He introduced the binomial name Palamedea cornuta. The horned screamer is now the only species placed in the genus Anhima that was introduced by the French zoologist Mathurin Jacques Brisson in 1760. The specific epithet cornuta is the Latin word for "horned". The German naturalist Georg Marcgrave had used the Latin name Anhima in 1648 for the horned screamer in his Historia naturalis Brasiliae. The name was from anhyma, the word for the bird in the Tupi language of South America.

== Description ==
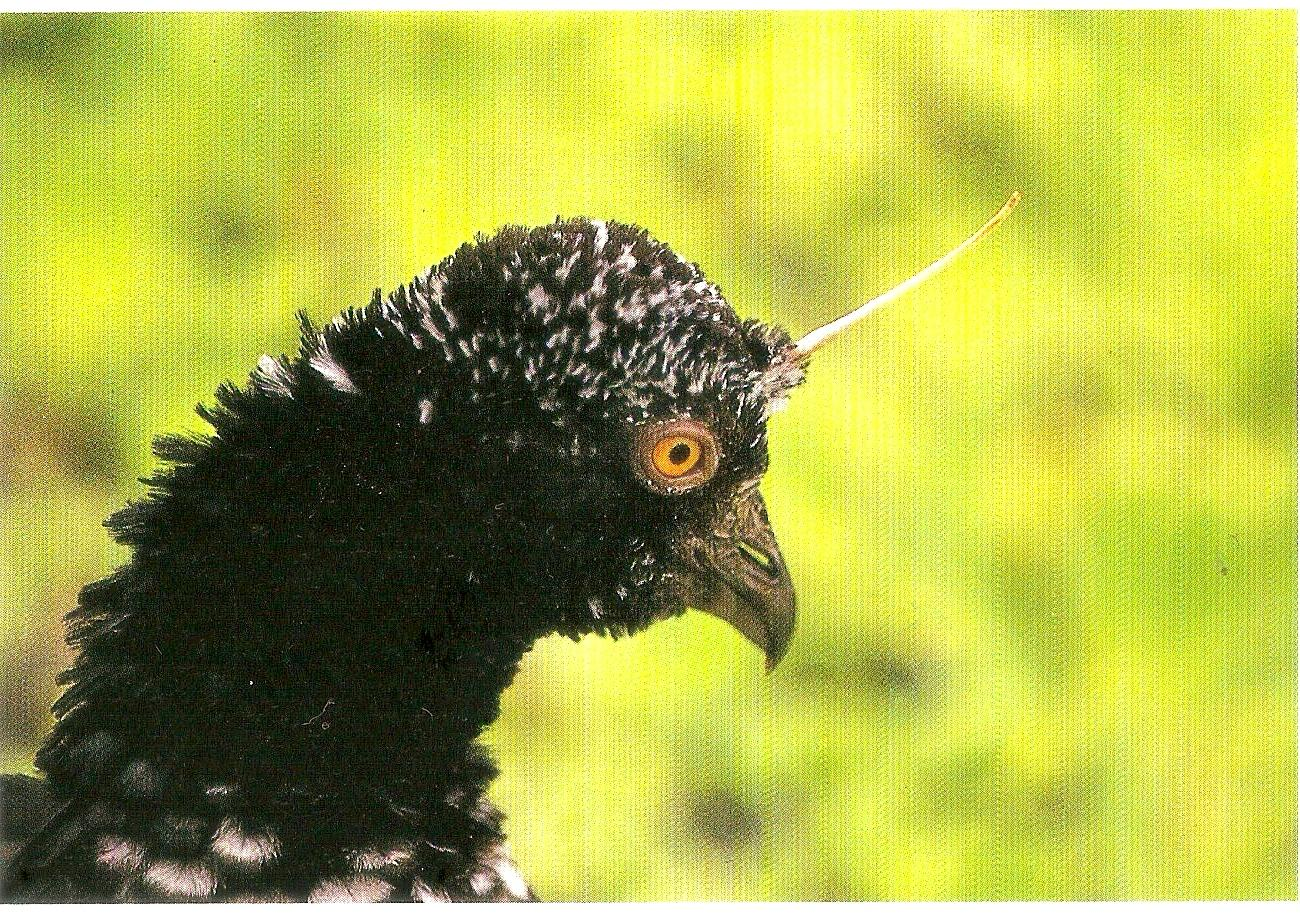
Close-up of head

The horned screamer is a massive 84–95 cm (33–37.5 in) long, 3–3.5 kg (6.6–7.7 lb) bird, with a small chicken-like bill. The upperparts, head, and breast are black, with white speckles on the crown, throat and wing coverts. There is a long spiny structure projecting forward from the crown. This structure is unique among birds and is not derived from a feather but is a cornified structure that is loosely attached to the skull and grows continuously while often breaking at its tip. This gives this species its name. It has very long and lanky legs and three large toes in each. The belly and under wing coverts are white. It has two sharp spurs on its wings and feet which are only partially webbed.

== Call ==
The horned screamer's call, as the name suggests, is a very loud and repetitive echoing sound. It is called "el clon-clon" in Ecuador because of this peculiar feature.

== Distribution and habitat ==
The horned screamer is found in lowlands from Colombia, Venezuela, Brazil, Bolivia, Peru, Ecuador, French Guiana, Suriname, and Guyana. It has been possibly extirpated from Trinidad. Despite having declined locally, it remains widespread and is fairly common overall. Its range in Brazil appears to have expanded in recent years.

== Behavior ==
Screamers, like most birds, tend to group together, but are for the most part semi-social. The existence of the screamer is rather sedentary. It lives in swamps, marshes, and meadows near rivers and lakes. The bird is herbivorous and feeds on water plants. It rarely flies, typically only for five seconds at a time. They are frequently observed alone or in pairs of up to six birds.

== Breeding ==
The horned screamer's breeding season is variable by geographic location. Its nest is a floating platform made out of vegetation. The female lays a clutch of two to seven eggs at 2 day intervals. The eggs are a long oval in shape. In Colombia, the eggs weigh around 136 g (4.8 oz) and measuring 84.6 mm × 61 mm (3.33 in × 2.40 in) in dimensions. Eggs are reportedly heavier in Brazil, weighing 149.9 g (5.29 oz) and measuring 86.8 mm × 59.8 mm (3.42 in × 2.35 in). Incubation is performed by both parents, the female typically incubates during the day and the male at night. Offspring hatch with yellow down, resembling the young of Anatidae. They typically stay close to adults. Young associate with their parents for at least one year.

== As a symbol ==
The horned screamer is the official bird of both the Department of Arauca and the Municipality of Arauca in Colombia, as well as a symbol of the National Reserve of Churute in Ecuador. The department and its capital are named after the bird, which is called arauco or aruco in Spanish.

== Conservation ==
The total population is estimated at under 100,000 birds, likely decreasing.
