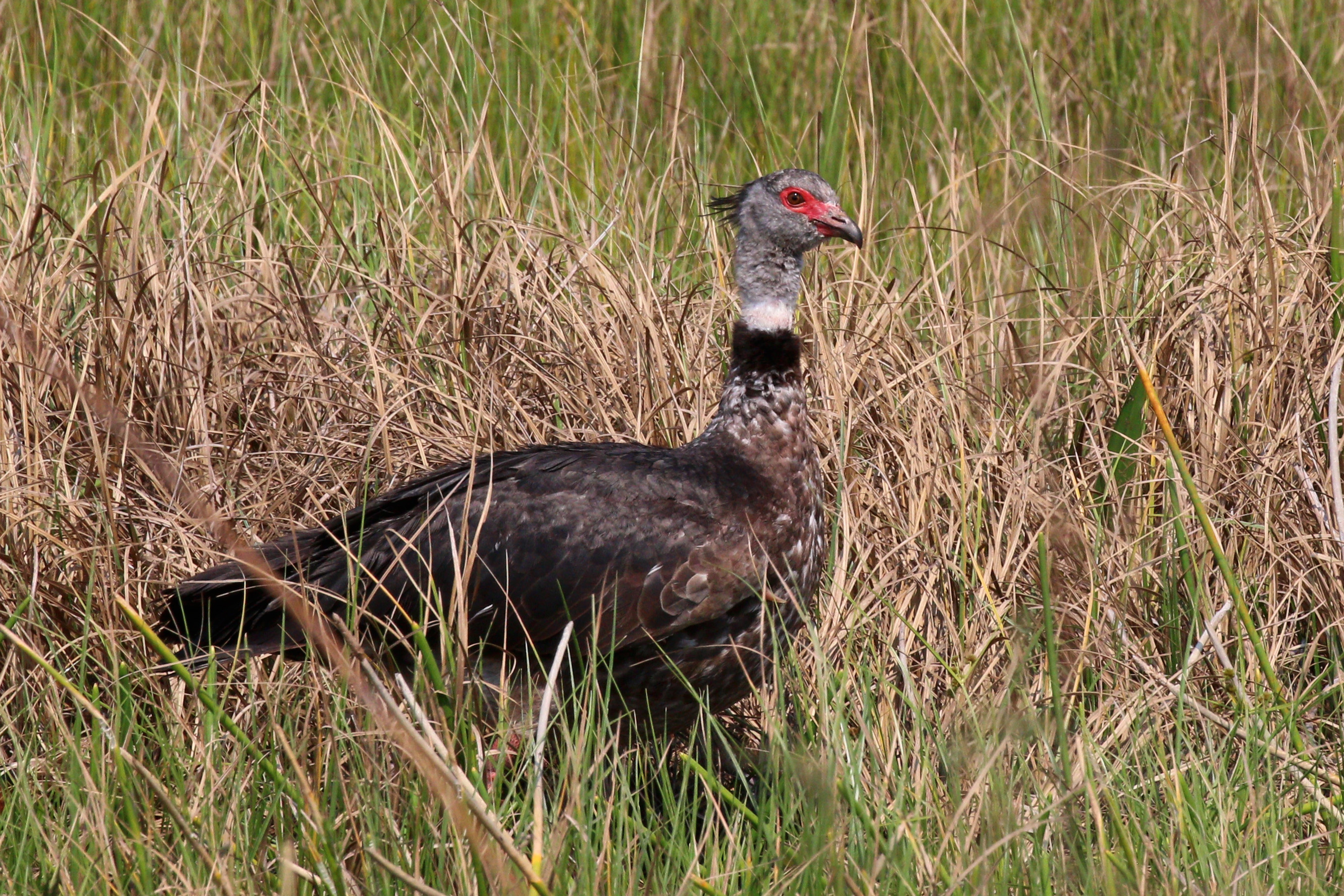
- In the Pantanal, Brazil

Conservation status
- Least Concern (IUCN 3.1)

Scientific classification
- Kingdom: Animalia
- Phylum: Chordata
- Class: Aves
- Order: Anseriformes
- Family: Anhimidae
- Genus: Chauna
- Species: C. torquata

Binomial name
- Chauna torquata (Oken, 1816)
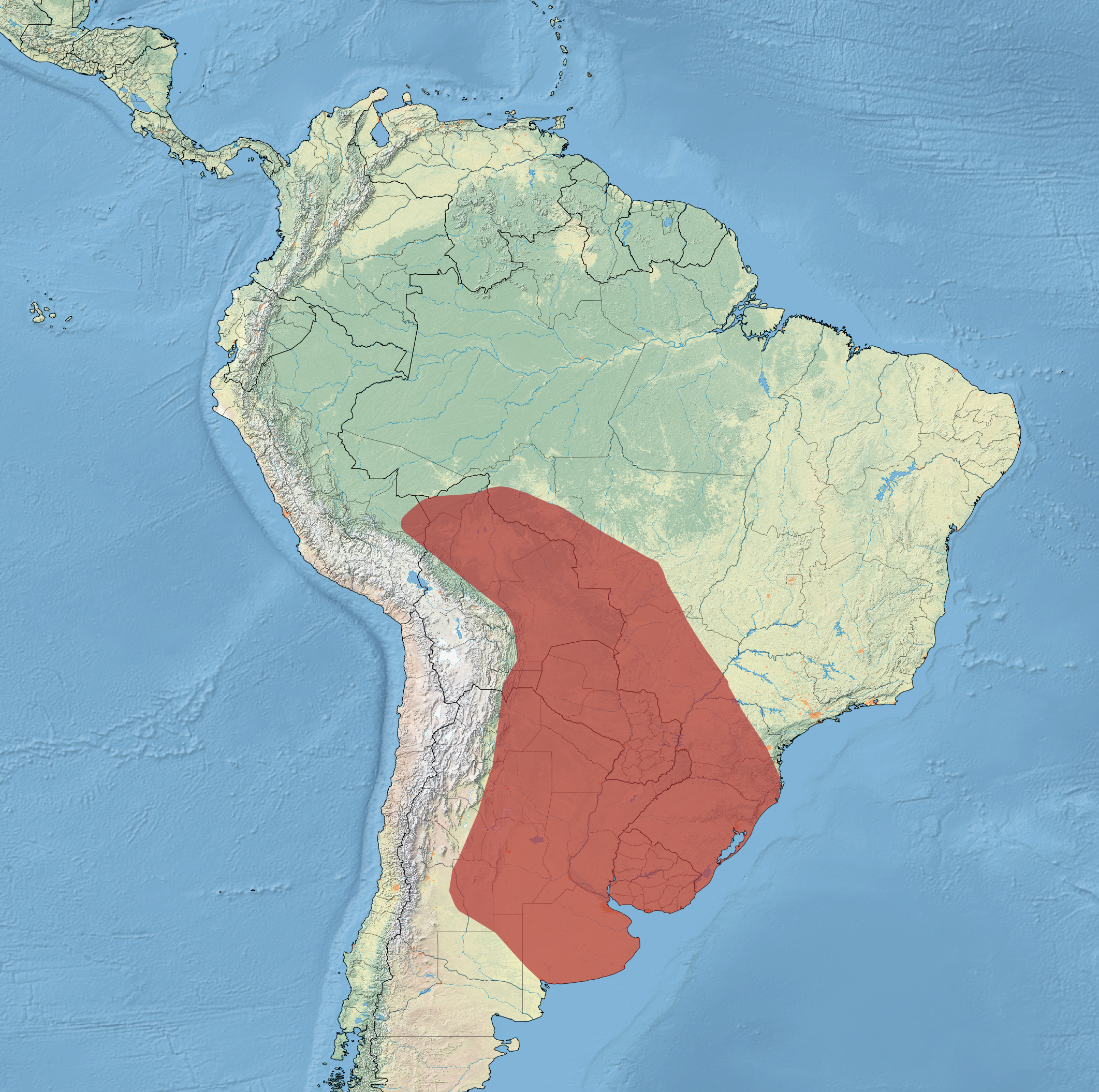
- Distribution map

= Southern screamer =

Species of bird

The southern screamer (Chauna torquata) is a species of bird in family Anhimidae of the waterfowl order Anseriformes. It is found in Argentina, Bolivia, Brazil, Paraguay, Peru, and Uruguay.

== Taxonomy and systematics ==
The southern screamer shares genus Chauna with the northern screamer (C. chavaria). One other species, the horned screamer (Anhima cornuta) is also in family Anhimidae. The southern screamer is monotypic.

== Description ==
The southern screamer is one of the largest birds of southern South America at 83 to 90 cm (33 to 35 in) long and weighing about 4.4 kg (9.7 lb). Their flat wing measures 50 to 57 cm (20 to 22 in), their tail 22 to 26 cm (8.7 to 10.2 in), and their culmen 4.0 to 5.4 cm (1.6 to 2.1 in). Weight is known from one female, which was 4.4 kg (9.7 lb). They are stout bodied with a disproportionately small head and a "chicken-like" grayish brown bill. The sexes have the same plumage. Their head and upperparts are gray with a velvety black "collar" around the base of the neck. Their wings and tail are dusky and the wing has two sharp spurs at its manus. The front of their neck, their breast, and their sides are pale gray faintly mottled and streaked with white. Their belly is unmarked pale gray or white. Their legs and feet are rosy.

== Distribution and habitat ==
The southern screamer is found from the eastern half of Bolivia south into Argentina as far as Buenos Aires Province and east through Paraguay into southwestern Brazil and Uruguay. It has also been documented as a vagrant in southeastern Peru. It inhabits tropical and subtropical wetlands, including lakes, marshes, and flooded meadows with scattered trees.

== Behavior ==
=== Movement ===
The southern screamer is generally considered to be non-migratory. However, seasonal changes in the numbers present in coastal and inland parts of Brazil's Rio Grande do Sul suggest local movements between them.

=== Locomotion ===
The southern screamer moves primarily on foot, yet is capable of swimming. It is also a strong flier.

=== Feeding ===
The southern screamer feeds on the leaves, stems, and seeds of aquatic plants and also on some crops. They usually graze like geese but have been seen digging for food. Flocks of up to about 100 forage together in the non-breeding season.

=== Breeding ===
The southern screamer forms long-term pair bonds that in some cases last for life. Males and females court with mutual preening and duet calling. They build a large nest of sticks and reeds near shallow water and often nest in about the same location for several years. The typical clutch size is three to five eggs but can be up to seven; eggs are laid in October and November. Both parents incubate the eggs and care for the young. The incubation period is 43 to 46 days; fledging occurs eight to ten weeks after hatch and the young are independent after about 12 weeks.

=== Vocalization ===
The southern screamer's "loud, unmelodious, double-noted trumpet call" has been further described as "a low, throaty, almost barking, brief oh-WOOOW which also sounds sometimes as be-SERK." Female's calls are somewhat weaker and higher pitched than males'. Screamers call both in flight and when perched, and the call can be heard for up to 3 km (2 mi). away.

== Domestication ==
Southern screamers are sometimes domesticated and can be suitable guard animals because of their loud, far-carrying, call.

== Status ==
The IUCN has assessed the southern screamer as being of Least Concern. It has a very large range, and though its population estimate is highly variable (100,000 – 1.0 million individuals) it is believed to be stable. No immediate threats have been identified. Draining of wetlands and persecution by farmers are potential threats, but "the species seems able to compensate fairly well".

== Gallery ==
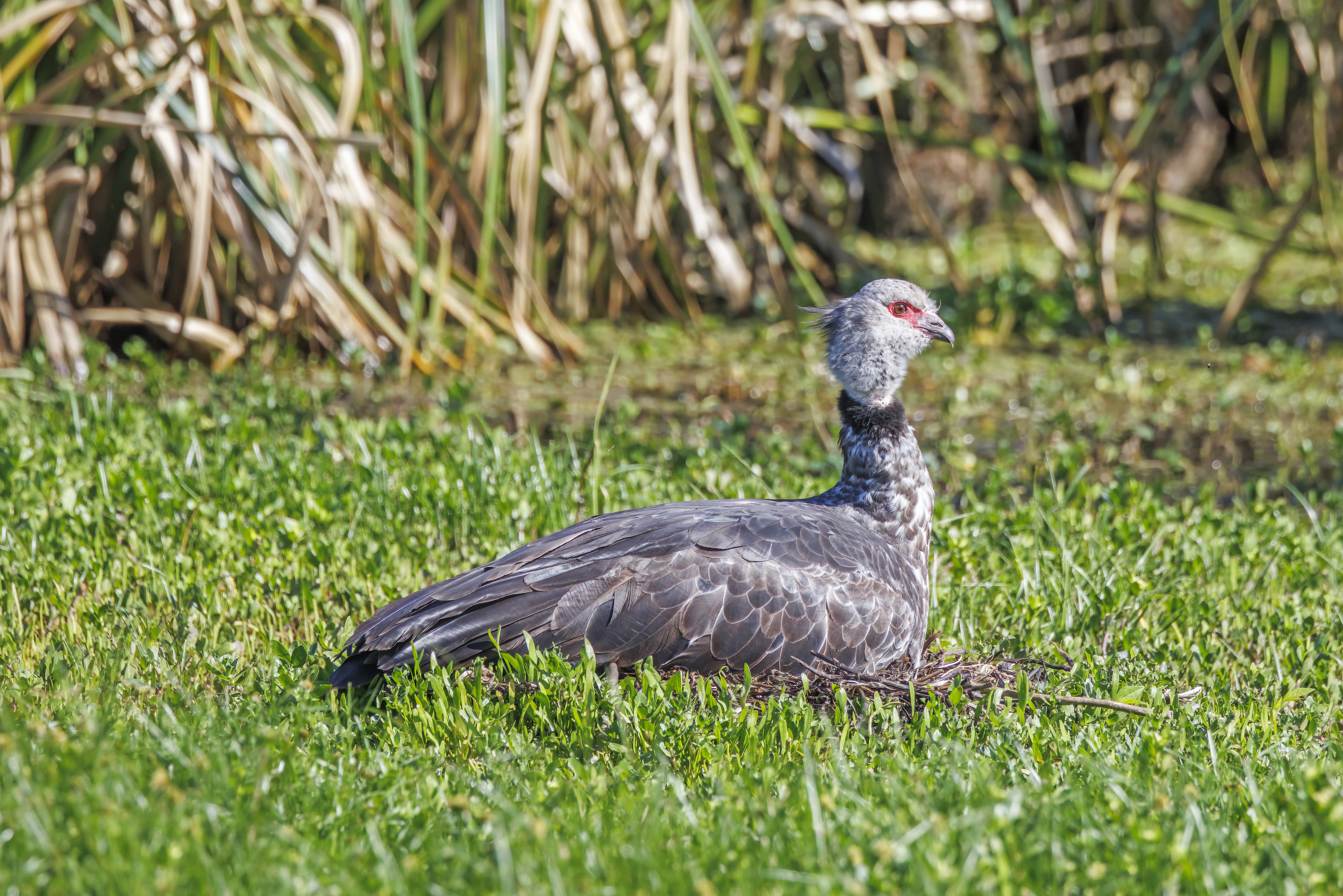
On nest, Uruguay

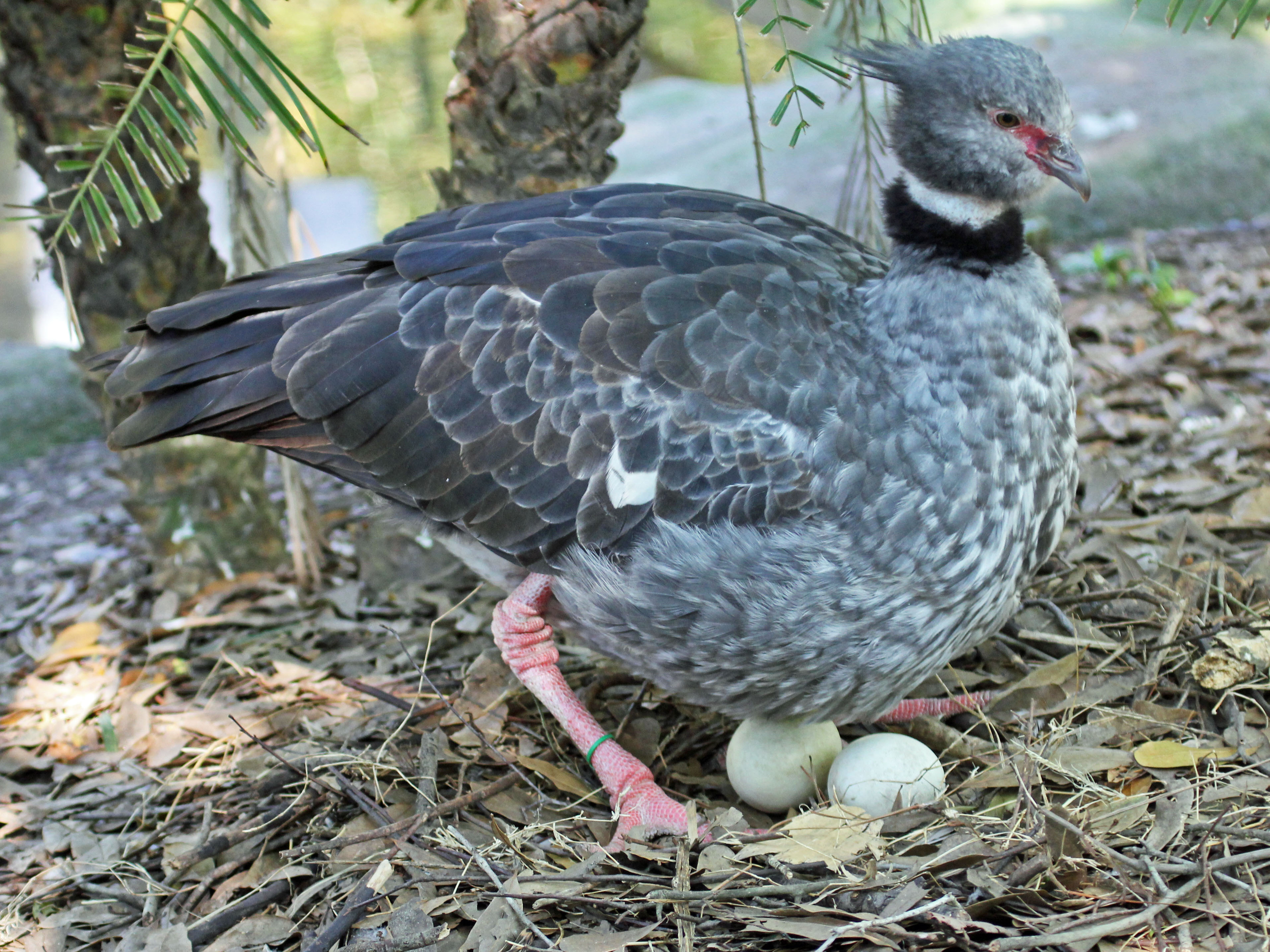
Sitting on two eggs

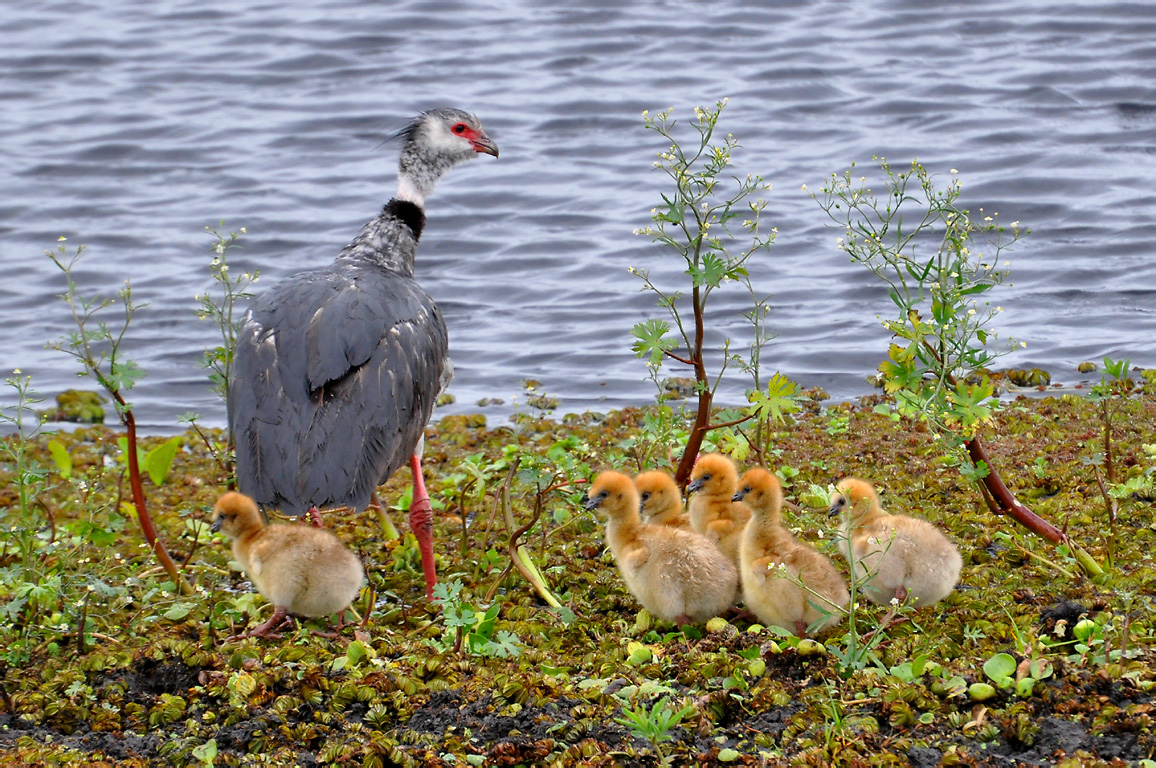
Family in Rio Grande do Sul, Brazil

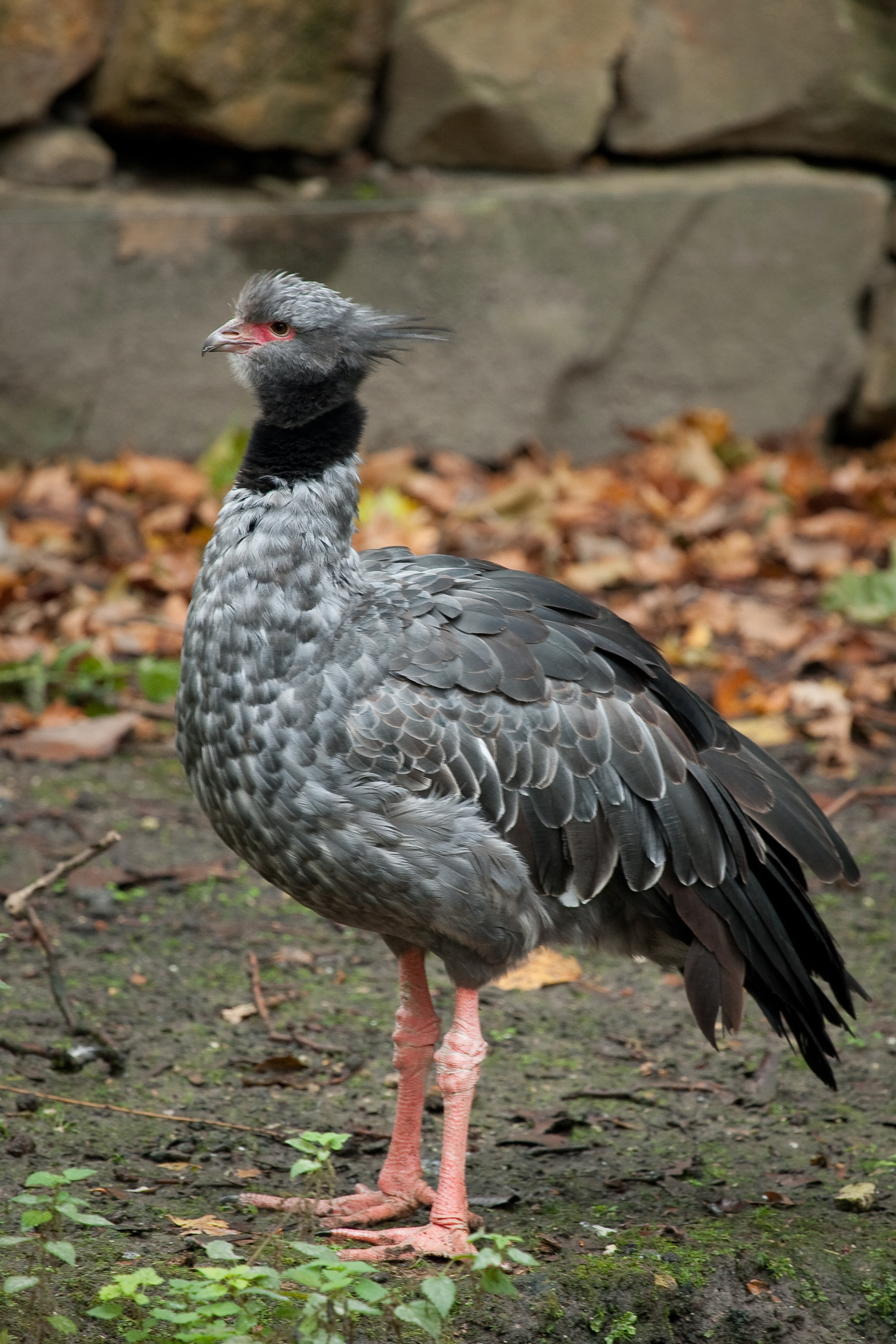
At Artis Zoo, Netherlands

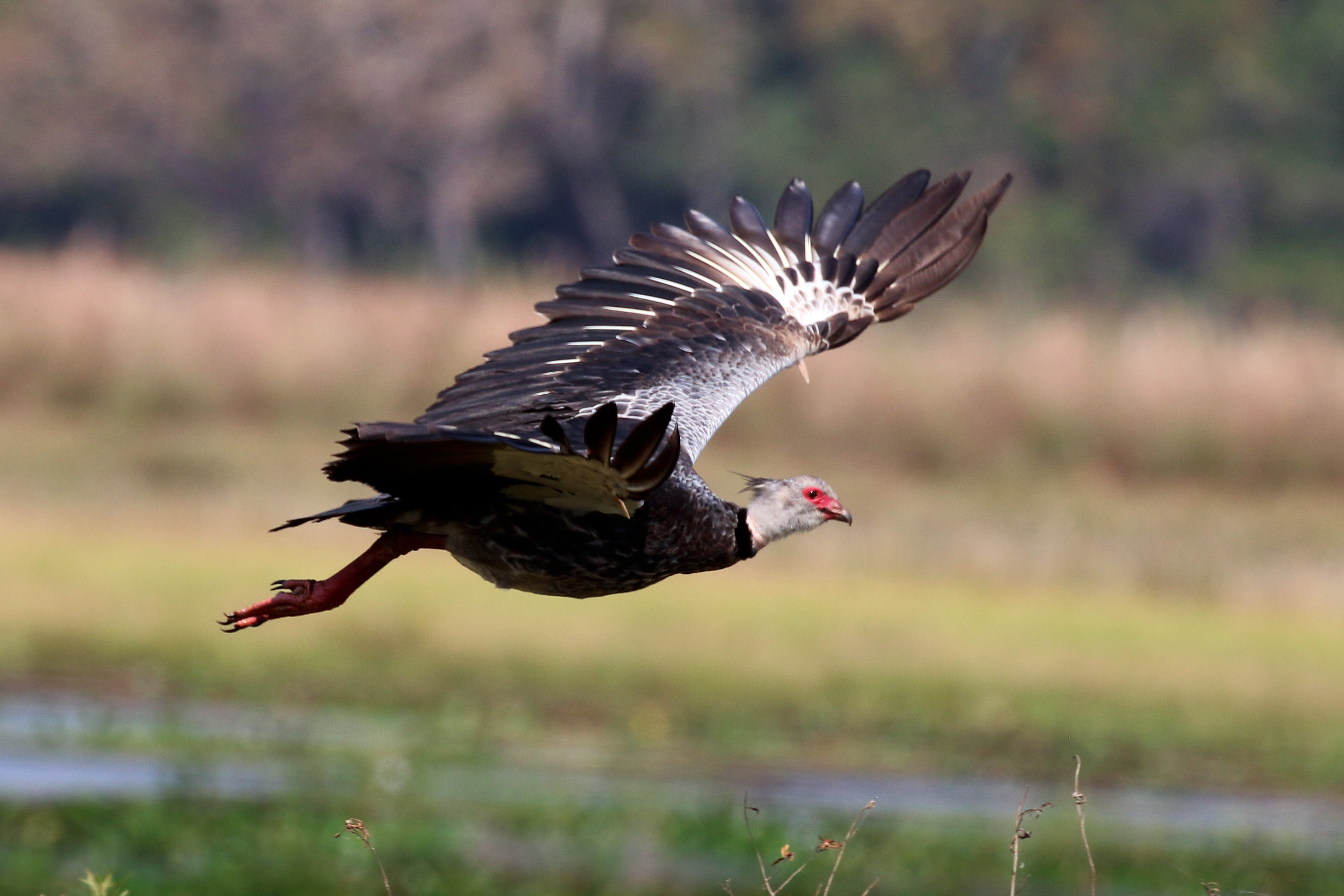
In flight, the Pantanal, Brazil
