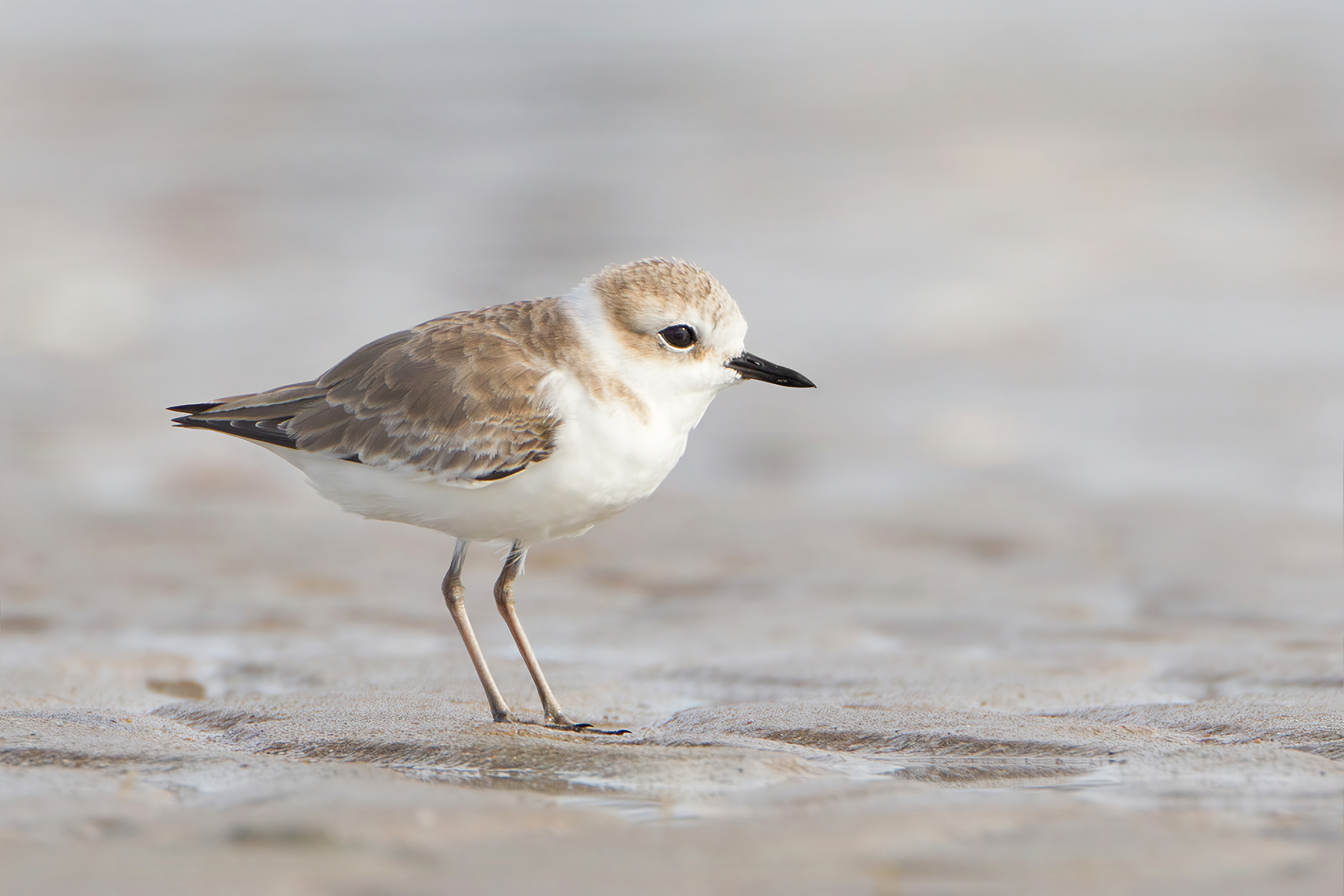
- A white-faced plover in Laem Pak Bia, Thailand

Conservation status
- Least Concern (IUCN 3.1)

Scientific classification
- Kingdom: Animalia
- Phylum: Chordata
- Class: Aves
- Order: Charadriiformes
- Family: Charadriidae
- Genus: Anarhynchus
- Species: A. dealbatus

Binomial name
- Anarhynchus dealbatus (Swinhoe, 1870)

Synonyms
- Aegialites dealbatus

= White-faced plover =

Species of bird

The white-faced plover (Anarhynchus dealbatus) is a small shorebird predominantly found along the coastal shores of subtropical and tropical eastern Asia. Initially described by British ornithologist Robert Swinhoe, the bird resembles the east Asian subspecies of the Kentish plover (A. a. nihonensis) with which it has been much confused and sometimes considered to be a subspecies.

== Taxonomy ==
The white-faced plover was first described in 1870 by the English naturalist Robert Swinhoe. The type specimen came from the island of Formosa (Taiwan) and he gave it the name Aegialites dealbatus. Since then the bird has been the subject of much debate and has variously been classified as being conspecific with Anarhynchus marginatus, Anarhynchus alexandrinus, Anarhynchus nivosus, Anarhynchus javanicus and Anarhynchus ruficapillus. Some authors consider it to be a subspecies of A. alexandrinus while others give it full species status as A. dealbatus.

However, the white-faced plover is now acknowledged as a distinct species by prominent international checklists, aligning with the recommendations based on recent genetic, ecological, and demographic findings.

== Description ==
The white-faced plover grows to a length of about 17 cm (6.7 in). It has a rounded head with a white fore-crown and a white supercilium. The crown is pale rufous brown upper parts are pale brownish-grey. The hind collar, throat and underparts are white. The beak and legs are dark and the tail short. Compared to the rather similar Kentish plover, it has a thicker, blunter beak, white lores, paler crown and upperparts, less black on the lateral breast patches and a larger white wingbar.

== Distribution and habitat ==
This bird is found along a wide seaboard area of southern China and adjacent northern Vietnam; its wintering range extends south across eastern Indochina towards Sumatra. It typically inhabits sandy beaches, mudflats and saltpans, and outside the breeding season visits reclaimed areas.

== Ecology ==
The diet of this bird has been little studied but is presumed to be similar to that of the Kentish plover which feeds on small invertebrates such as insects and their larvae, spiders, molluscs, crustaceans and marine worms. It feeds on the foreshore, searching visually for prey then dashing forward to catch the prey or probing the substrate with its beak. Its breeding habits are not known.
