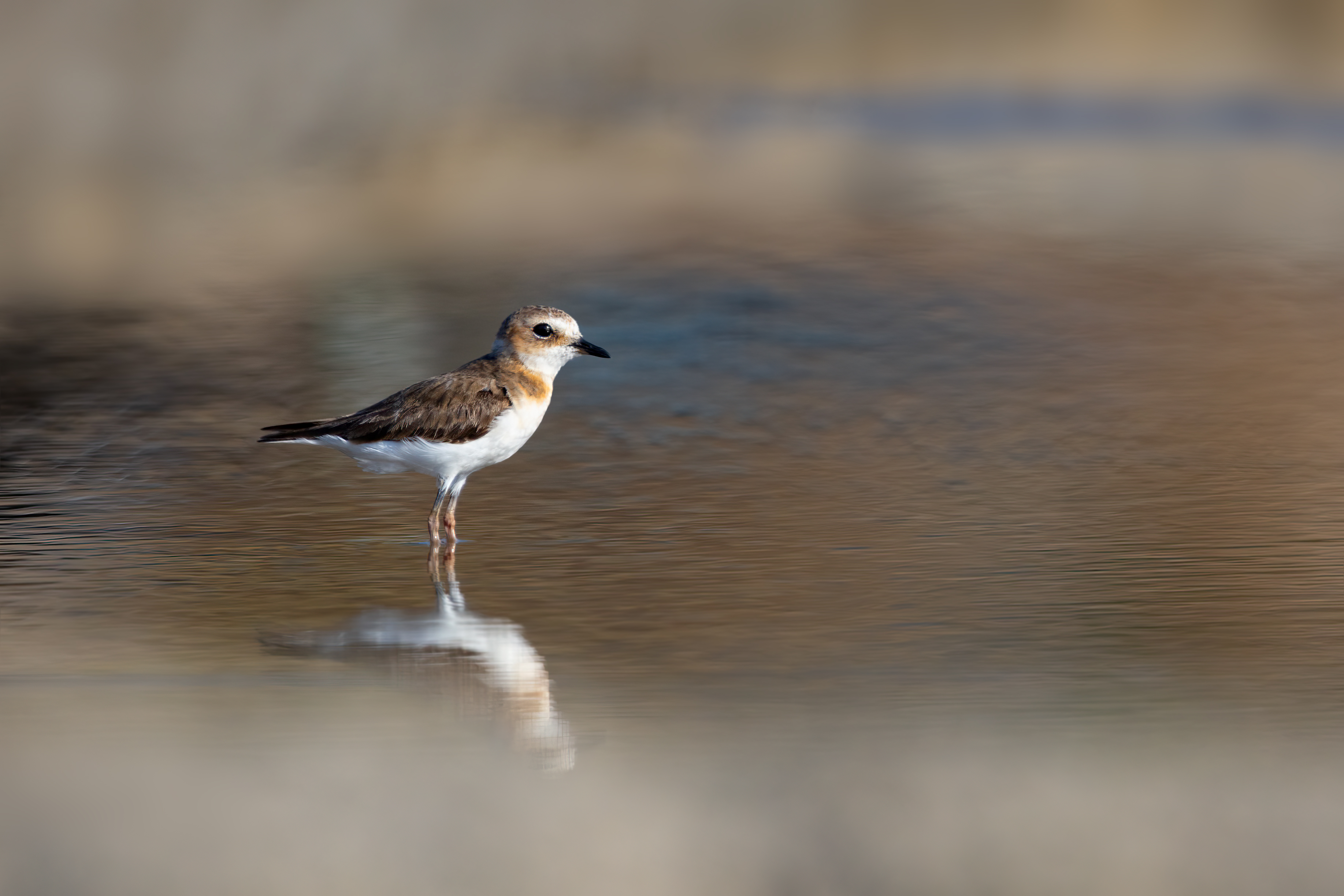

Conservation status
- Least Concern (IUCN 3.1)

Scientific classification
- Kingdom: Animalia
- Phylum: Chordata
- Class: Aves
- Order: Charadriiformes
- Family: Charadriidae
- Genus: Anarhynchus
- Species: A. javanicus

Binomial name
- Anarhynchus javanicus (Chasen, 1938)

Synonyms
- Charadrius javanicus

= Javan plover =

Species of bird

The Javan plover (Anarhynchus javanicus) is a Charadriidae species with an unclear taxonomic status. Endemic to Indonesia and Timor-Leste, it inhabits sandy shores and intertidal mudflats, where it is thought to breed year-round. Its diet mainly consists of crustaceans, worms, and mollusks. It is mostly threatened by human disturbance and coastal development in Southeast Asia, and is listed as Least Concern on the IUCN Red List.

== Description ==
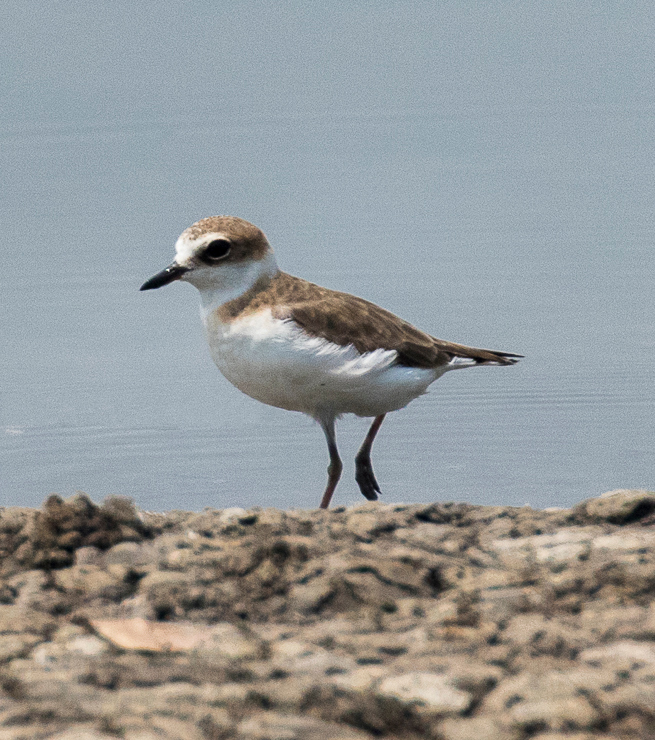
Javan plover in Jakarta bay area

The Javan plover is a small 15 cm (5.9 in) shorebird with a reddish-brown coloration that begins at the crown and extends from the back of the neck onto the sides of the breast, with a smaller dark patch below. The breast collar is also reddish-brown, while the hind neck collar is white and always incomplete. The upperparts are brown or grey brown, and its underparts are white. Its head plumage is characterized by a black bar on the forecrown and a dark brown horizontal eyestripe. Its supercilium is typically white and extends behind the eye. The head is generally oval-shaped. The black bill is about 12–16 mm (0.47–0.63 in) and is blunt and thick at the base. White outer tail feathers and a distinct white bar across the upper wing can be seen during flight. In breeding plumage, the Javan plover has clear and usually complete yellowish-brown lateral breast patches.

Breeding males have a short white supercilium, a bright white forehead and darker coloration. Compared to males, breeding females have a lighter, browner cap, full dark patches on the sides of the chest, and yellowish-tan supercilia that stretch past the eyes. Some females may also have a darker brown coloration or a combination of gray-brown and yellow-brown undertones. Unlike males, females do not have rich reddish-brown tones in their plumage, and non-breeding males look similar as breeding females, as both have a partial collar and lighter, less defined patches on the sides of their breast.

While the Javan plover resembles the Kentish plover (Anarhynchus alexandrinus), the Malaysian plover (Anarhynchus peronii), and the red-capped plover (Anarhynchus ruficapillus), it can be distinguished by its paler legs, longer tibia, single patches on the sides of its chest, and its incomplete white collar on the back of its neck. The juvenile can be told apart by its paler and more diffused breast-side patches and its light brownish plain upperparts with a slightly paler forehead and supercilium. Its wing coverts are small and neatly arranged with yellowish-brown fringes. Following post-juvenile molt, the Javan plover keeps its wing coverts, although the majority of the upperparts are replaced.

== Taxonomy ==
The Javan plover was first described in 1938 by Frederick Nutter Chasen who proposed the scientific name Charadrius alexandrinus javanicus classifying it as a subspecies of the Kentish plover. The holotype specimen was captured in March 1936 along the coast near Jakarta on the island of Java, and additional paratypes comprising three males and five females were also collected on Java. It is a member of the order Charadriiformes and the family Charadriidae.

The Javan plover is currently treated as a separate species and is monotypic, although its taxonomic status remains uncertain. Following phylogenetic analyses, it was moved from the genus Charadrius to the genus Anarhynchus, along with most species formerly placed in Charadrius.

The Javan plover is closely related to the white-fronted plover (Anarhynchus marginatus), the Kentish plover, the white-faced plover (Anarhynchus dealbatus), the snowy plover (Anarhynchus nivosus), and the red-capped plover, all of which have been occasionally classified as a single species. The Javan plover has been considered most often a subspecies of the Kentish plover because of low genetic divergence (1.2%). It has also been associated with the red-capped plover, or, in some cases, the Malaysian plover, despite apparent morphological differences.

== Distribution and habitat ==
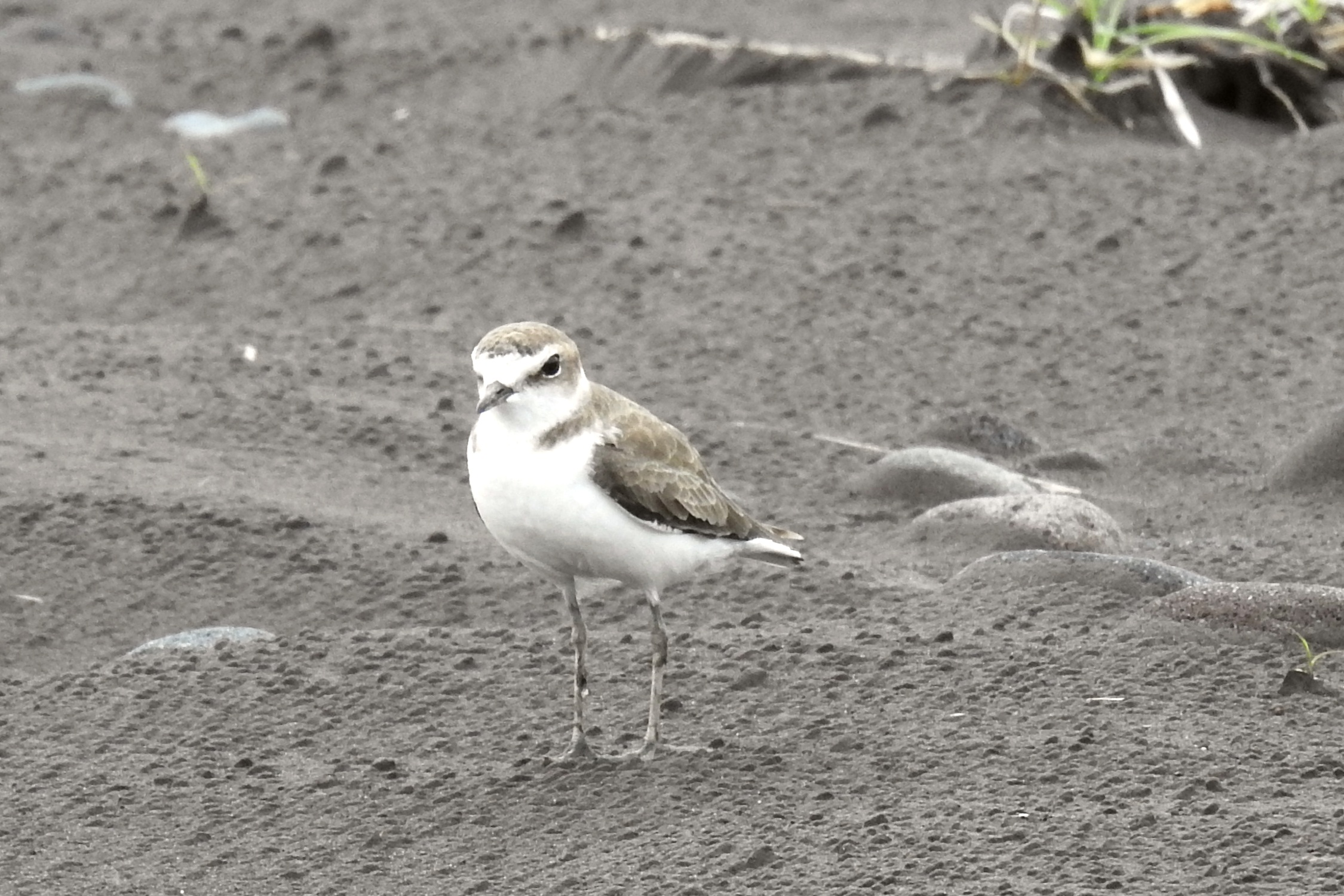
Javan plover on a sandy beach in South Lumajang, East Java, Indonesia

The Javan plover was previously considered to be endemic to the Indonesian islands of Java, Bali and the Kangean Islands. However, it was also sighted in southern Sumatra, Madura, Lombok, southwestern Sulawesi, Sumbawa, Flores, western and central Lesser Sundas, Meno Island, Semau and Timor-Leste.

The Javan plover is sedentary. It inhabits sandy beaches, coastal plains, inland fishponds and rice fields. Open flats with minimal vegetation and a high cover of bare rock are typically favored. It has also been observed up to 30 km (19 mi) inland on Java.

== Behavior ==
=== Vocalizations ===
Because the Javan plover is classified as a subspecies of the Kentish plover in most scientific literature, vocalization data are mostly limited to reports of a repeated single soft, rising “kweek”.

While the Kentish plover produces a shorter “krk-krk…pik” or “pik” call, the Javan plover gives a longer “kweek……kweek” or a single drawn-out “kweek”.

When adults attempt to protect their chicks or nests from humans, they call repeatedly with a soft, rising “tu-wit” while performing apparent distraction behaviors to divert attention, where they either mimic the quick, erratic movements of a fleeing rodent (i.e., “rodent-run display”) or feign injury by dragging a wing (i.e., “broken-wing display”).

=== Diet ===
The Javan plover has a similar diet to the Kentish plover, although not much data is available. Near the shore, it feeds on crustaceans, polychaete worms, and mollusks. Like other small plovers, the Javan plover has been recorded foraging for crabs at low tide by lowering its head and quickly running across the sand to capture prey. When inland, it can also prey on insects like beetles and flies, and spiders. The Javan plover has been observed foraging in dry, cleared rice-fields before seeding or after harvest.

=== Reproduction ===
Very little information is available regarding the breeding behavior of the Javan plover. Breeding is suspected to occur year-round, during both wet and dry seasons. The peak breeding season is believed to take place from May to August. A second breeding season may also occur between September and January to February. In West Java, chicks have been observed as early as late April. In eastern Java, egg-laying occurs in June, September, and January, and hatching has been recorded in June and August, while courtship or territorial displays have been observed from May to August. Observations of breeding activity have been reported on Sulawesi in early October, in southeastern Sumatra and Timor-Leste in July, and on Bali in June.

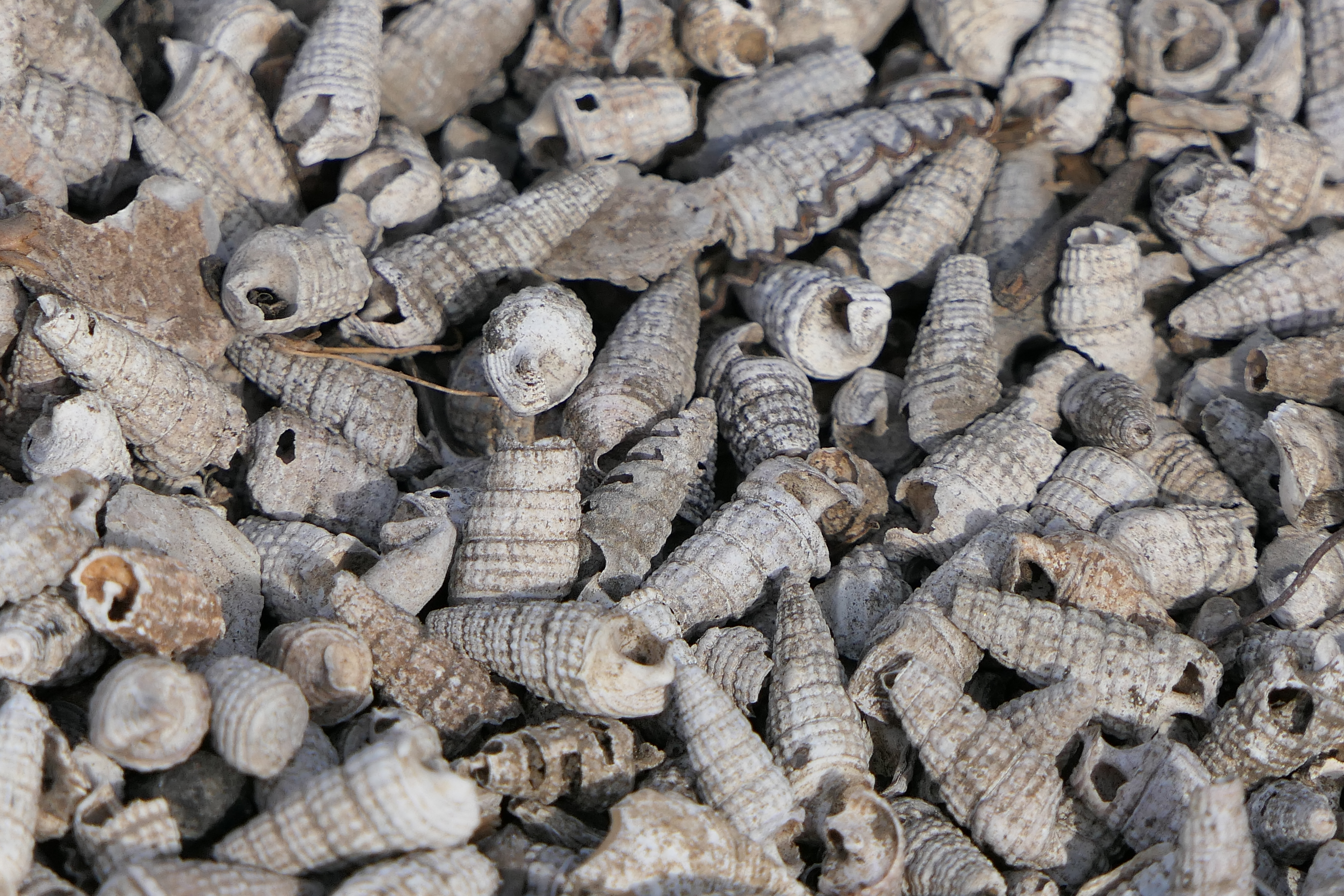
Shells of mud snails (Pirenella cingulata)

The Javan plover breeds in coastal and inland habitats far from human activity (2-5 km away), including open dune slacks, shores of rivers and lakes, marshes, dry plains, rice fields, and dry aquaculture ponds. The nest usually consists of a small cavity about 4 cm deep and is lined with shells of mud snails (Pirenella cingulata). The nesting site is prepared collaboratively by both sexes. Ground-nesting shorebirds, including plovers, select their nesting site based on specific habitat characteristics, such as substrate particle size and vegetation cover.

During the breeding season, some Javan plovers were observed attacking larger predatory birds to protect their chicks. Documented predators of both chicks and eggs include the long-tailed shrike (Lanius schach), the Sunda crow (Corvus enca), and the Javan mongoose (Herpestes javanicus).

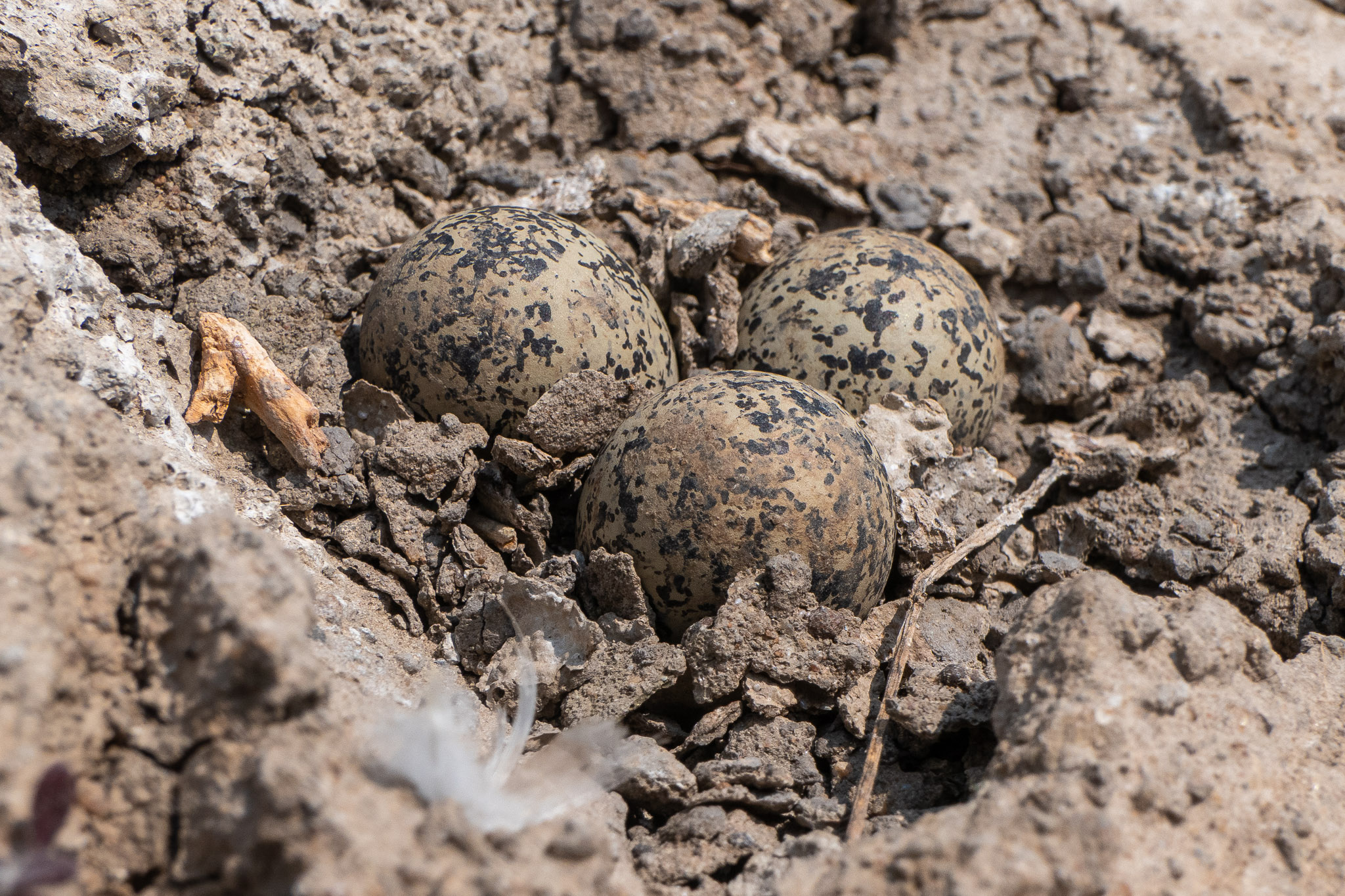
Kentish plover (Anarhynchus alexandrinus) eggs, similar to Javan plover (Anarhynchus javanicus) eggs

Eggs of the Javan plover are light beige to dark olive-cream, and the shell has many black markings, typically interspersed with grayish or sepia undertones. A typical clutch consists of four eggs, each measuring approximately 23 mm (0.91 in) in width and 40 mm in length. Both parents contribute to incubation. They often dampen their underparts with water before taking turns sitting on the eggs, likely to keep the eggs from overheating during high temperatures, and the incubation lasts between 21 and 23 days.

Hatchlings closely resemble those of other small Charadriidae plovers. Chicks are precocious and leave the nest shortly after birth. After hatching, they can immediately walk and forage for food independently, although they remain under parental care for up to three months.

== Threats and conservation status ==
The Javan plover is listed as Least Concern on the IUCN Red List. The global population is estimated between 2,000 and 6,000 individuals. Population numbers are thought to be stable. Current threats include egg-collecting, human disturbance, and coastal development under increasing tourism pressures in Southeast Asia.
