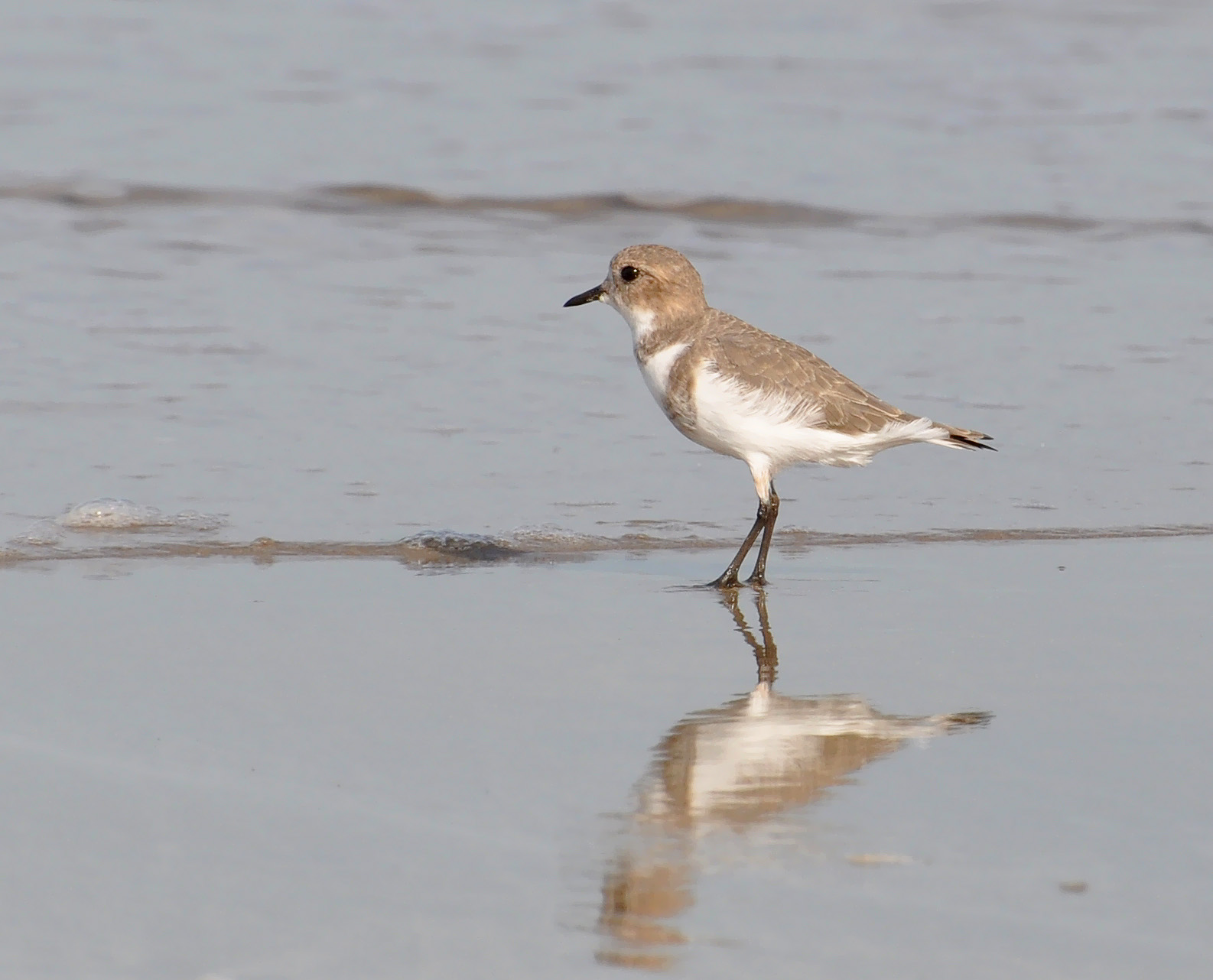
- Non-breeding

Conservation status
- Least Concern (IUCN 3.1)

Scientific classification
- Kingdom: Animalia
- Phylum: Chordata
- Class: Aves
- Order: Charadriiformes
- Family: Charadriidae
- Genus: Anarhynchus
- Species: A. falklandicus

Binomial name
- Anarhynchus falklandicus (Latham, 1790)

Synonyms
- Charadrius falklandicus (protonym)

= Two-banded plover =

Species of bird

The two-banded plover (Anarhynchus falklandicus) is a species of bird in subfamily Charadriinae of family Charadriidae. It is found in Argentina, Brazil, Chile, the Falkland Islands, and Uruguay.

== Taxonomy and systematics ==
The two-banded plover has at times been considered conspecific with the puna plover (A. alticola) but now some treat the two as a superspecies. The puna plover is monotypic, but the mainland and Falkland populations might represent subspecies.

== Description ==
The two-banded plover is 17 to 19 cm (6.7 to 7.5 in) long and weighs 62 to 72 g (2.2 to 2.5 oz). It has a potbellied appearance and its bill and legs are black. Adult males in breeding have a white forehead, lower face, breast, and belly. They have a black bar on the forecrown and a chestnut crown and hindneck. Their upperparts are brown. They have two black breastbands, the upper one of which is frequently incomplete. (This feature is more prevalent in the Falklands population.) Adult females' crown is duller than the male's, what is black on the male is brownish on the female, and the upper breastband has white flecks throughout. Non-breeding adults have gray instead of black and gray-brown instead of chestnut. Juveniles resemble non-breeding adults but with brown breastbands, a darker face, and buffy fringes on the upperparts feathers.

== Distribution and habitat ==
The two-banded plover is found on the Falkland Islands and coastally to somewhat inland in Argentina, Uruguay, extreme southeastern Brazil, and central and southern Chile. It inhabits gravel shores, sand beaches, wet savanna, and short grasslands, usually near streams or ponds both fresh and brackish. Outside the breeding season it is also found on tidal mudflats. It is mostly coastal but breeds as high as 1,200 m (3,900 ft) in southern Argentina.

== Behavior ==
=== Movement ===
A small part of the Chilean and Argentinian populations of two-banded plover are year-round residents. There is also a small year-round population in extreme southeastern Brazil. Most individuals from Chile and Argentina, and essentially all of those in Tierra del Fuego, migrate north in Chile and to southern and eastern Uruguay and southeastern Brazil. The population on the Falklands is resident. Outside the breeding season the species is somewhat social and is found in loose flocks of up to about 200 birds.

=== Feeding ===
The two-banded plover forages at the edge of the surf, on stranded kelp mats, in short grass, and on the edges of freshwater ponds. Its diet is mostly small invertebrates including polychaetes, bivalves, gastropods, insects, and spiders.

=== Breeding ===
The two-banded plover's egg season is mostly September to January but sometimes extends later. Its nest is a depression in the ground that is sometimes lined with vegetation. The clutch size is two to four eggs; both parents incubate. The incubation period and time to fledging are not known.

=== Vocalization ===
What is believed to be the two-banded plover's display song is "a repeated phrase of 2–3 mellow notes followed by a gravelly trill, e.g. 'whit-whit-whitrrrrrrt'." Frequently heard calls are "a short emphatic 'pit' or mellower 'whit'."

== Status ==
The IUCN has assessed the two-banded plover as being of least concern. It has a large range, and though its population size is not known it is believed to be stable. No immediate threats have been identified.
