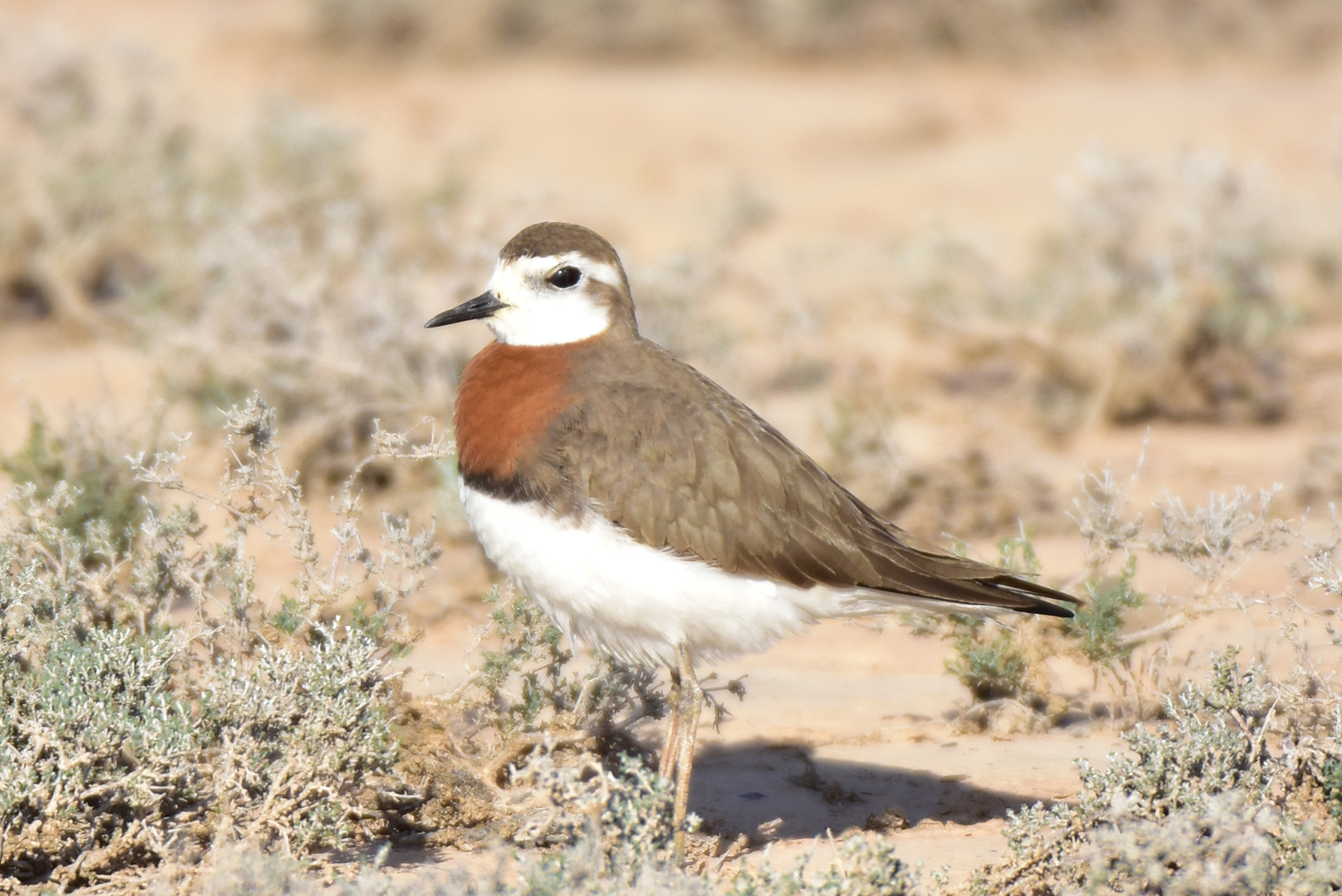

Conservation status
- Least Concern (IUCN 3.1)

Scientific classification
- Kingdom: Animalia
- Phylum: Chordata
- Class: Aves
- Order: Charadriiformes
- Family: Charadriidae
- Genus: Anarhynchus
- Species: A. asiaticus

Binomial name
- Anarhynchus asiaticus (Pallas, 1773)

Synonyms
- Charadrius asiaticus (protonym); Eupoda asiatica

= Caspian plover =

Species of bird

The Caspian plover (Anarhynchus asiaticus) is a wader in the plover family of birds. The specific asiaticus is Latin and means "Asian", although in binomials it usually means the type locality was India.

This plover breeds in western and central Asia and migrates southward to eastern and southern Africa to escape the northern winter.

== Description ==
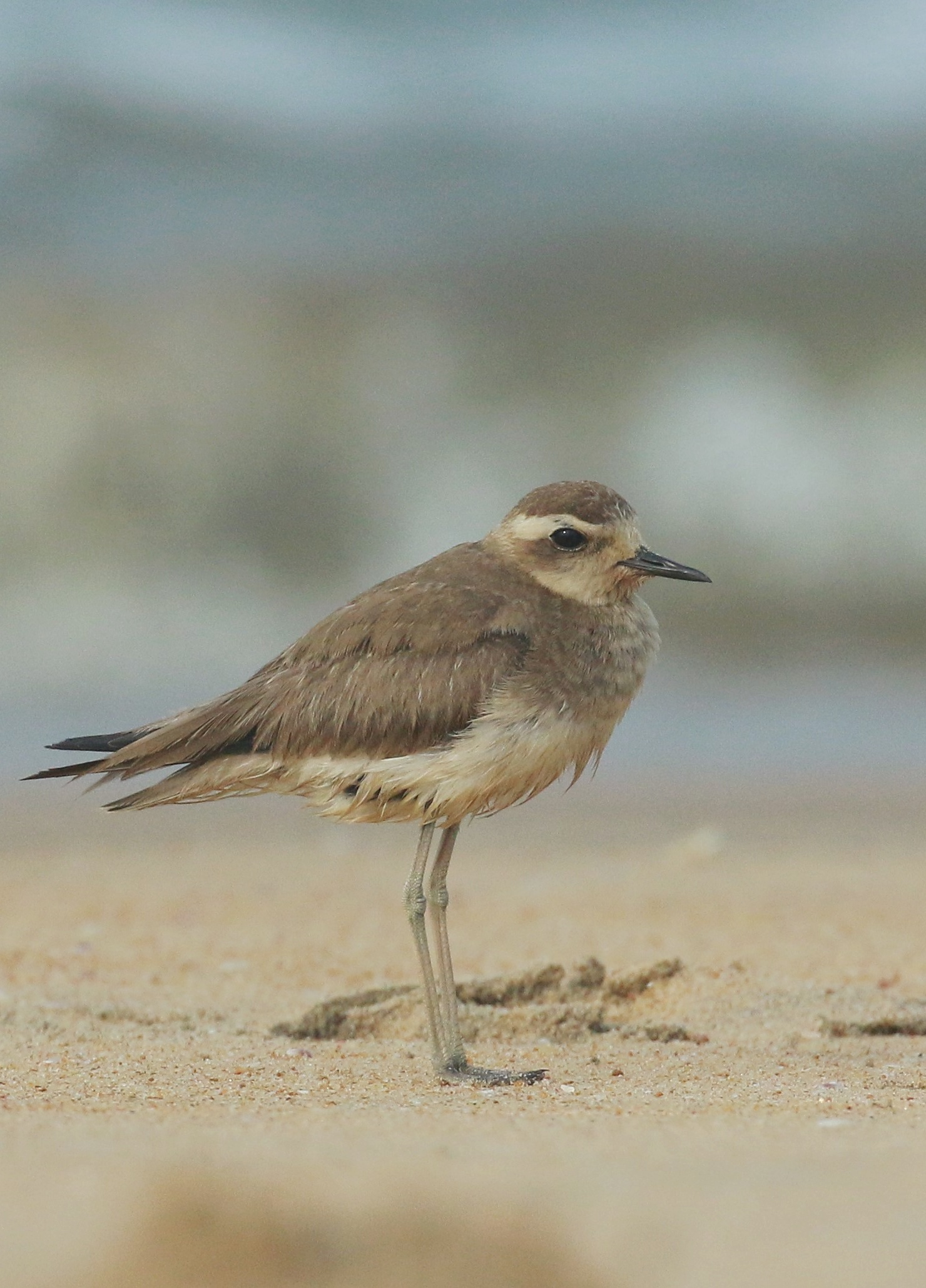
Caspian plover in winter plumage

This plover is slightly larger than ringed plover, and it recalls greater sandplover and lesser sandplover in appearance. It is slimmer and longer-legged than the sandplovers, and has a much stronger white supercilium, and a long thin bill. It also lacks white tail sides and a weak wing bar.

Summer males have grey-brown backs and a white face and belly. The breast is chestnut, bordered black below. Other plumages have a grey-brown breast band, although the summer female may show a hint of chestnut. The call is a sharp chip.

== Distribution and habitat ==
The Caspian plover breeds in western Asia in the area of the Caspian Sea. Its range includes southern Russia, Turkey, Iran, Turkmenistan, Kazakhstan, Uzbekistan and Afghanistan. Its habitat is steppes, desert verges, saltpans and saline soils amongst sparse shrubby vegetation up to an altitude of about 800 m (2,625 ft). After breeding, it migrates to eastern and southern Africa, going as far as the Zambezi River. Its winter quarters are usually dry grassland, coastal dunes, saltmarshes, dry floodplains and sometimes cultivated land. This plover is a very rare vagrant to western Europe. It is also a rare vagrant to Australia.

== Biology ==
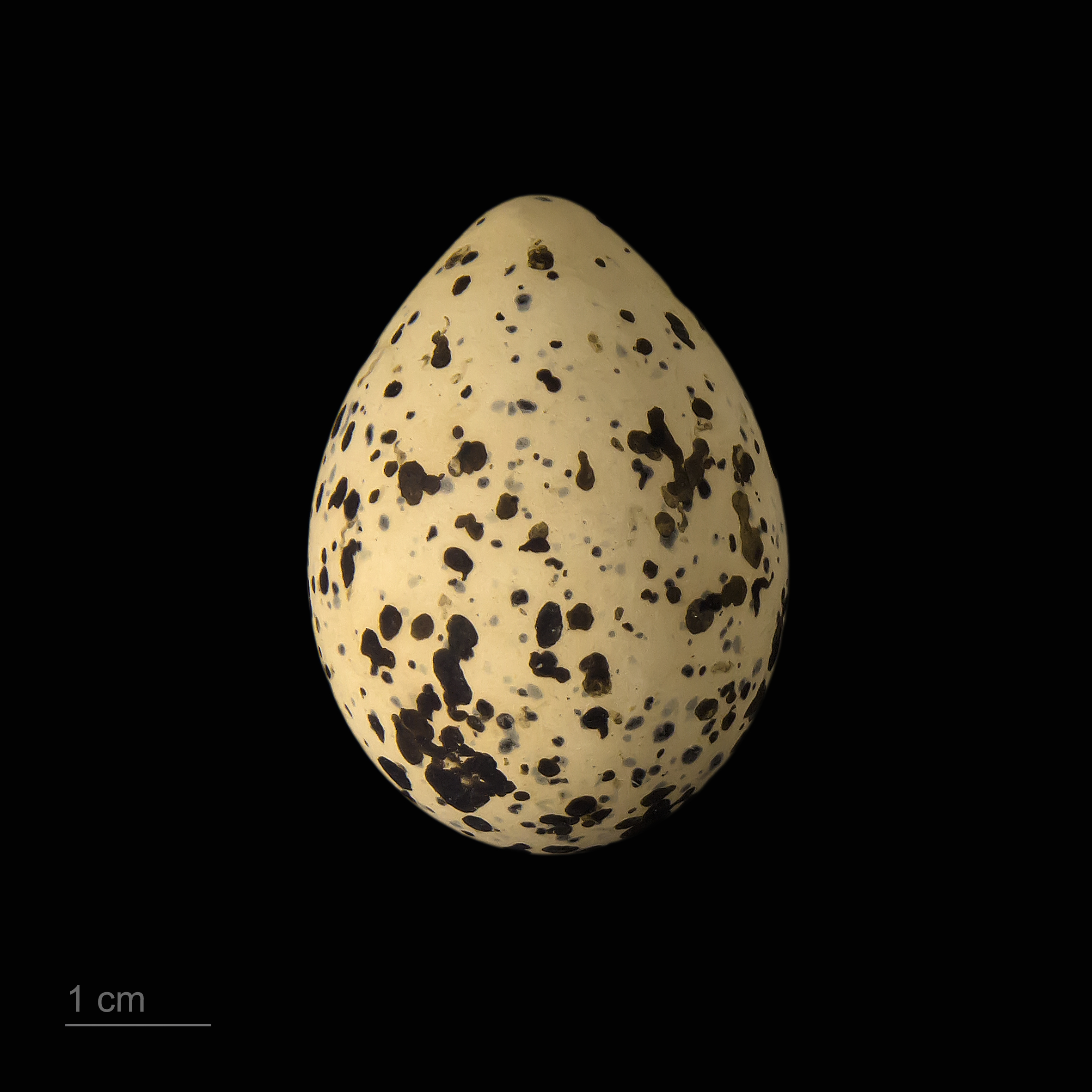
Charadrius asiaticus - MHNT

It breeds on open grassland in central Asia, mainly to the north and east of the Caspian Sea. It breeds in loose colonies, with three eggs being laid in a nest on the bare ground or among short vegetation.

It feeds in a similar way to other plovers picking beetles, termites, ants, grasshoppers, small snails and other small prey mainly from the ground. It sometimes eats the seeds of grasses.

== Status ==
Caspian Plover in Saudi Arabia

The Caspian plover has a very wide range. The number of birds may be declining slowly due to degradation of its breeding range, especially in Europe, however the IUCN lists it as being of Least Concern because it does not consider the rate of decline justifies putting it in a more threatened category.

It is one of the species to which the Agreement on the Conservation of African-Eurasian Migratory Waterbirds (AEWA) applies.
