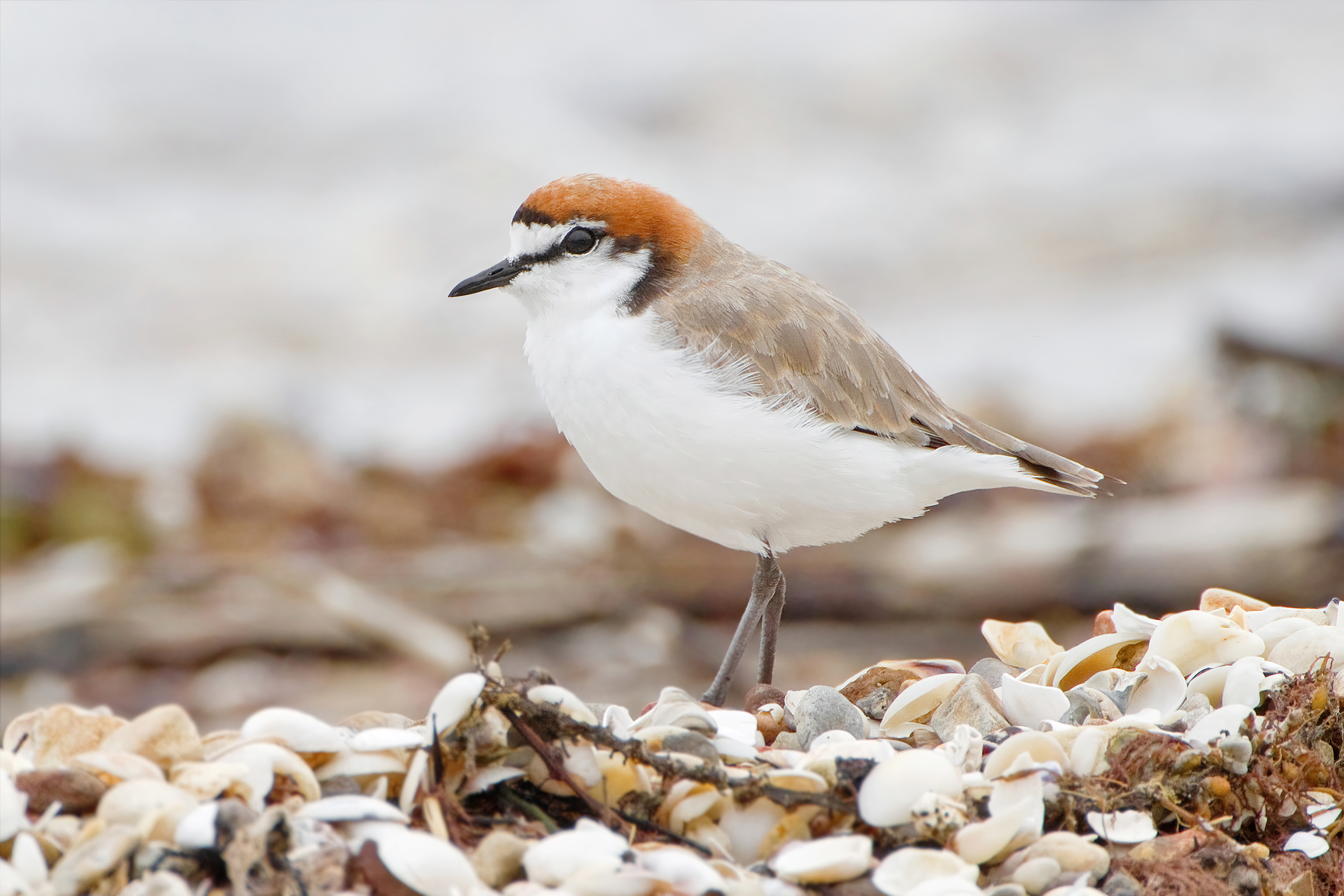
- Male in breeding plumage
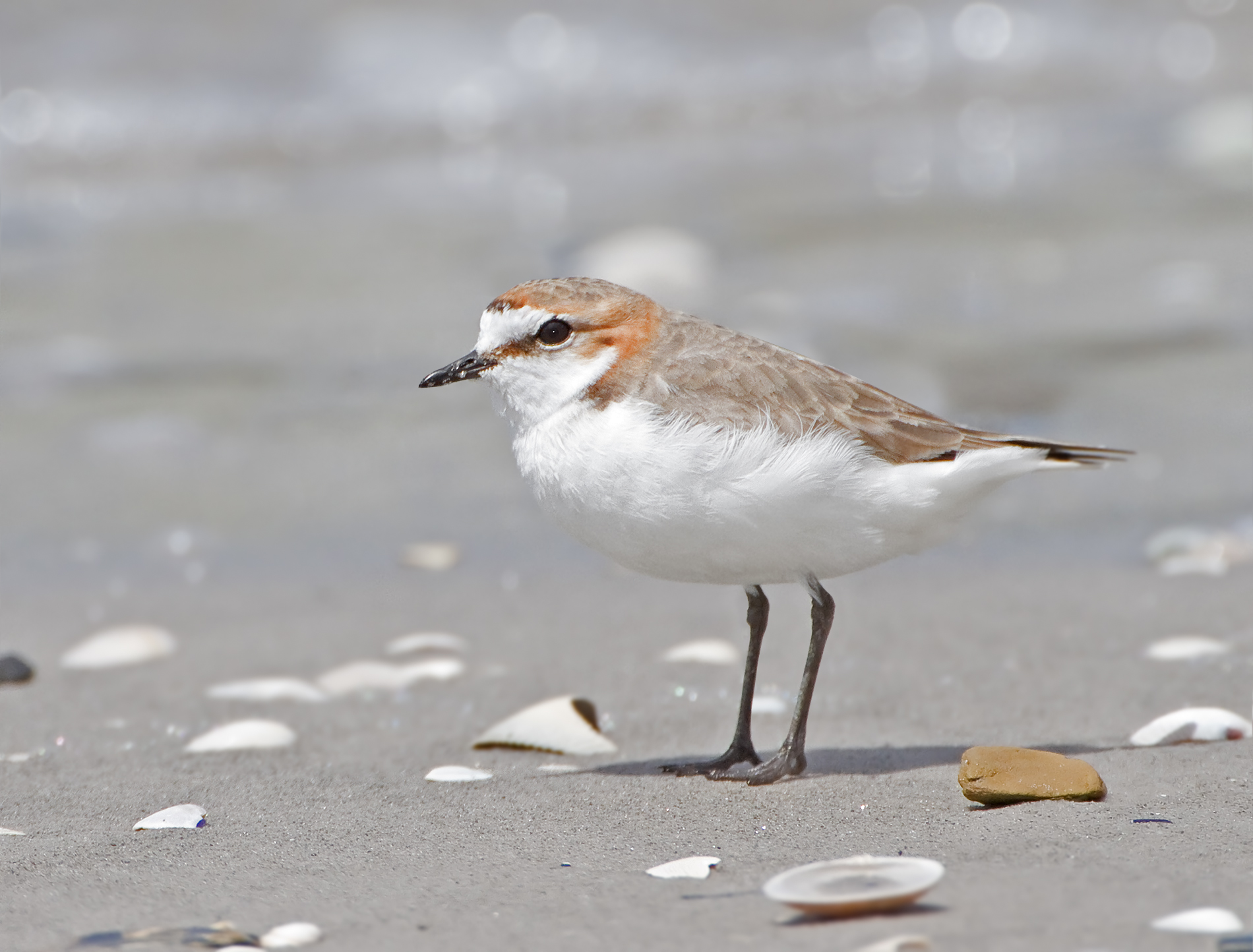
- Female in breeding plumage

Conservation status
- Least Concern (IUCN 3.1)

Scientific classification
- Kingdom: Animalia
- Phylum: Chordata
- Class: Aves
- Order: Charadriiformes
- Family: Charadriidae
- Genus: Anarhynchus
- Species: A. ruficapillus

Binomial name
- Anarhynchus ruficapillus (Temminck, 1821)

= Red-capped plover =

Species of bird

The red-capped plover (Anarhynchus ruficapillus), also known as the red-capped dotterel, is a small species of plover.

It breeds in Australia. This species is closely related to (and sometimes considered conspecific with) the Kentish plover, Javan plover, and white-fronted plover.

== Description ==
Red-capped plovers have a white forehead and underparts. Their upperparts are mainly grey-brown. Adult males have a rufous or reddish-brown crown and hindneck. Adult females have a paler rufous and grey-brown crown and hindneck, with a pale loreal stripe. The upperwing of Anarhynchus ruficapillus shows dark brown remiges (flight feathers) and primary covert feathers with a white wingbar in flight. Its length is 14–16 cm (5.5–6.3 in) and its wingspan is 27–34 cm (10.6–13.4 in); it weighs 35–40 g (1.2–1.4 oz).

Breeding plumage shows a red-brown crown and nape with black margins. Non-breeding plumage is duller and lacks the black margins.

== Distribution and habitat ==
Manly Marina, SE Queensland, Australia

The red-capped plover is widespread in Australia; it is a vagrant to New Zealand, although it bred there for some time in small numbers from 1950–1980. The species occupies a range of coastal and inland habitats, including estuaries, bays, beaches, sandflats, and mudflats; inland saline wetlands. It is also found in inland wetland areas with bare ground.

== Food ==
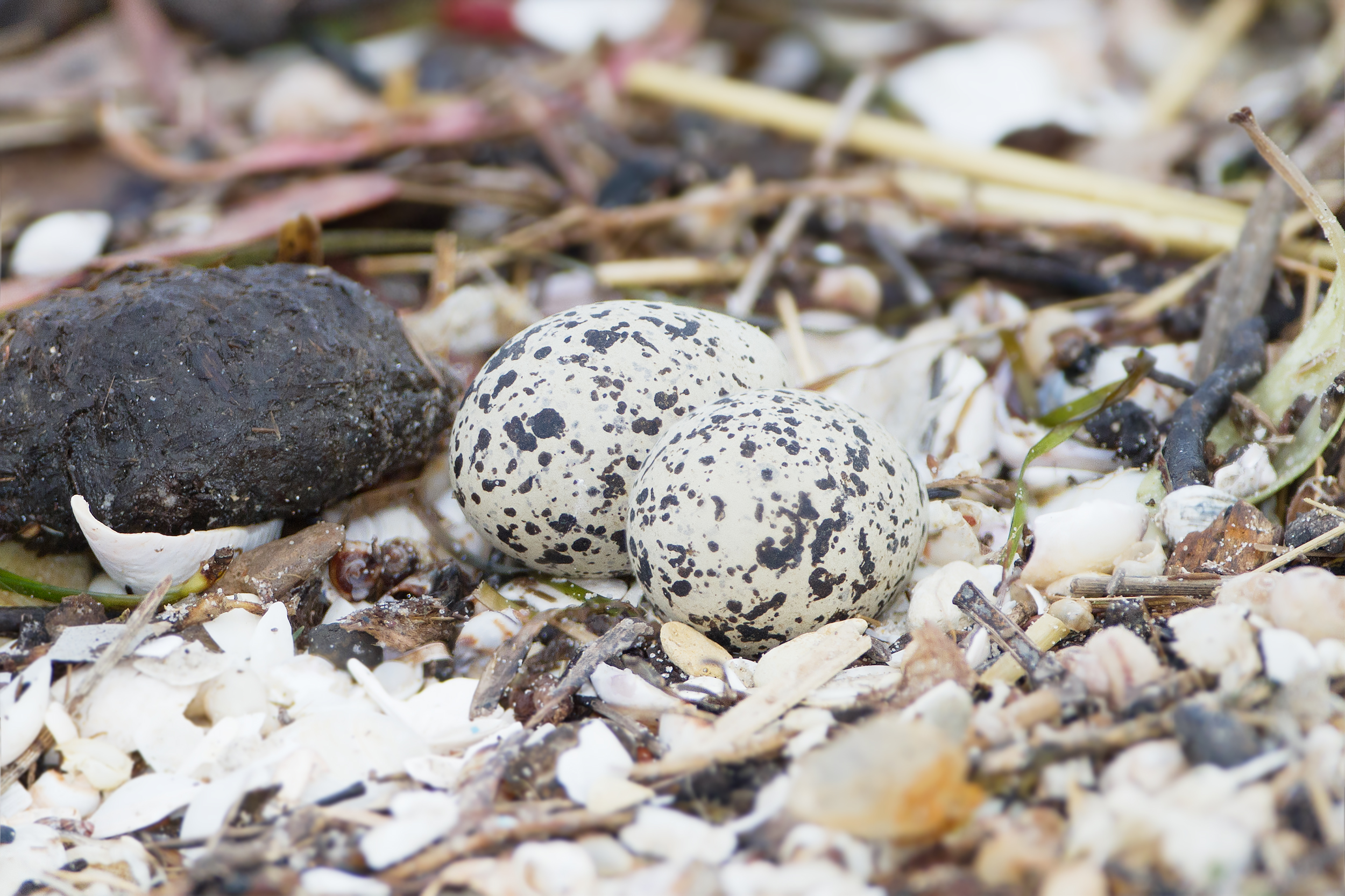
"Nest" with eggs

The red-capped plover feeds mostly on small invertebrates, especially molluscs, crustaceans, and worms.

== Breeding ==
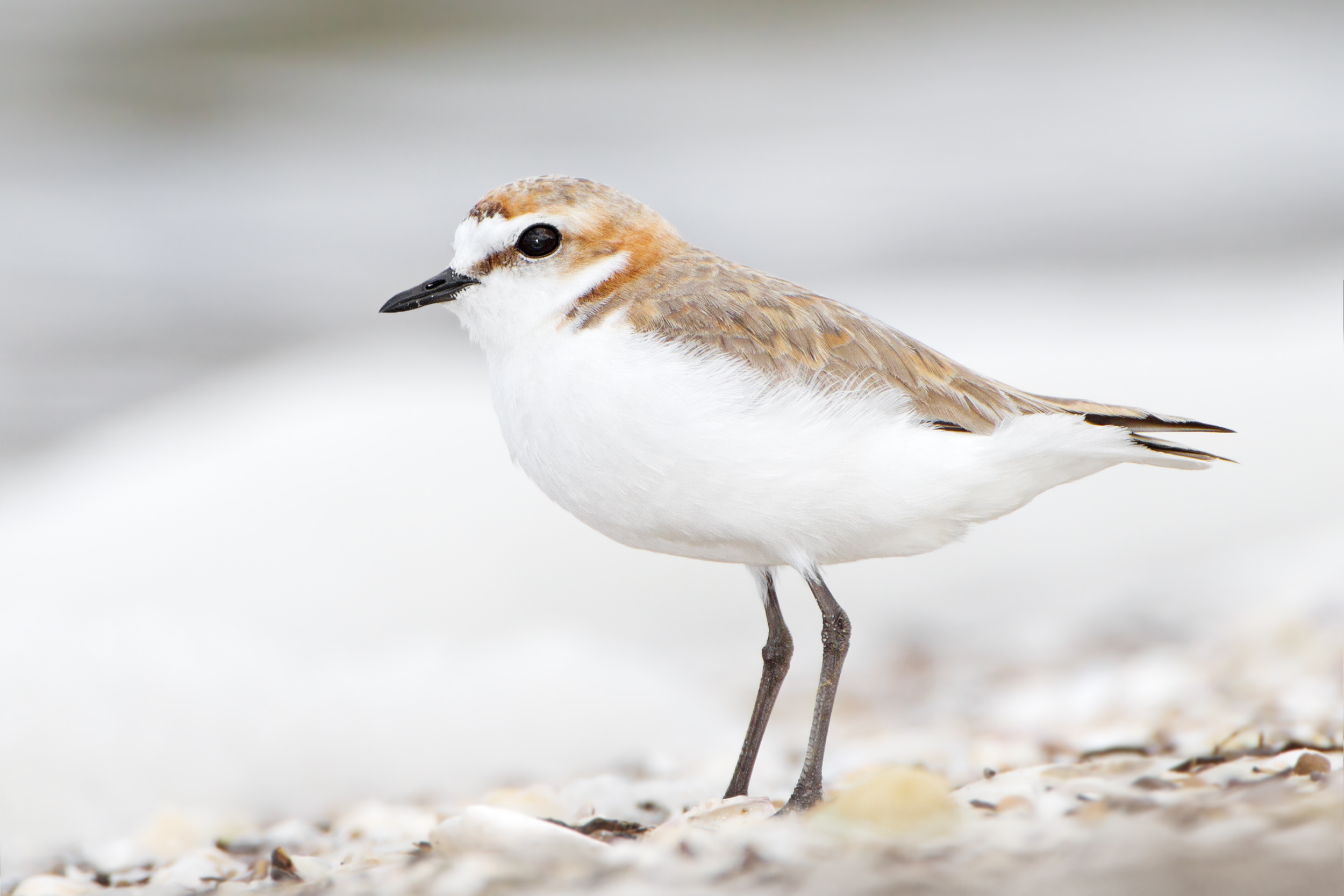
Female

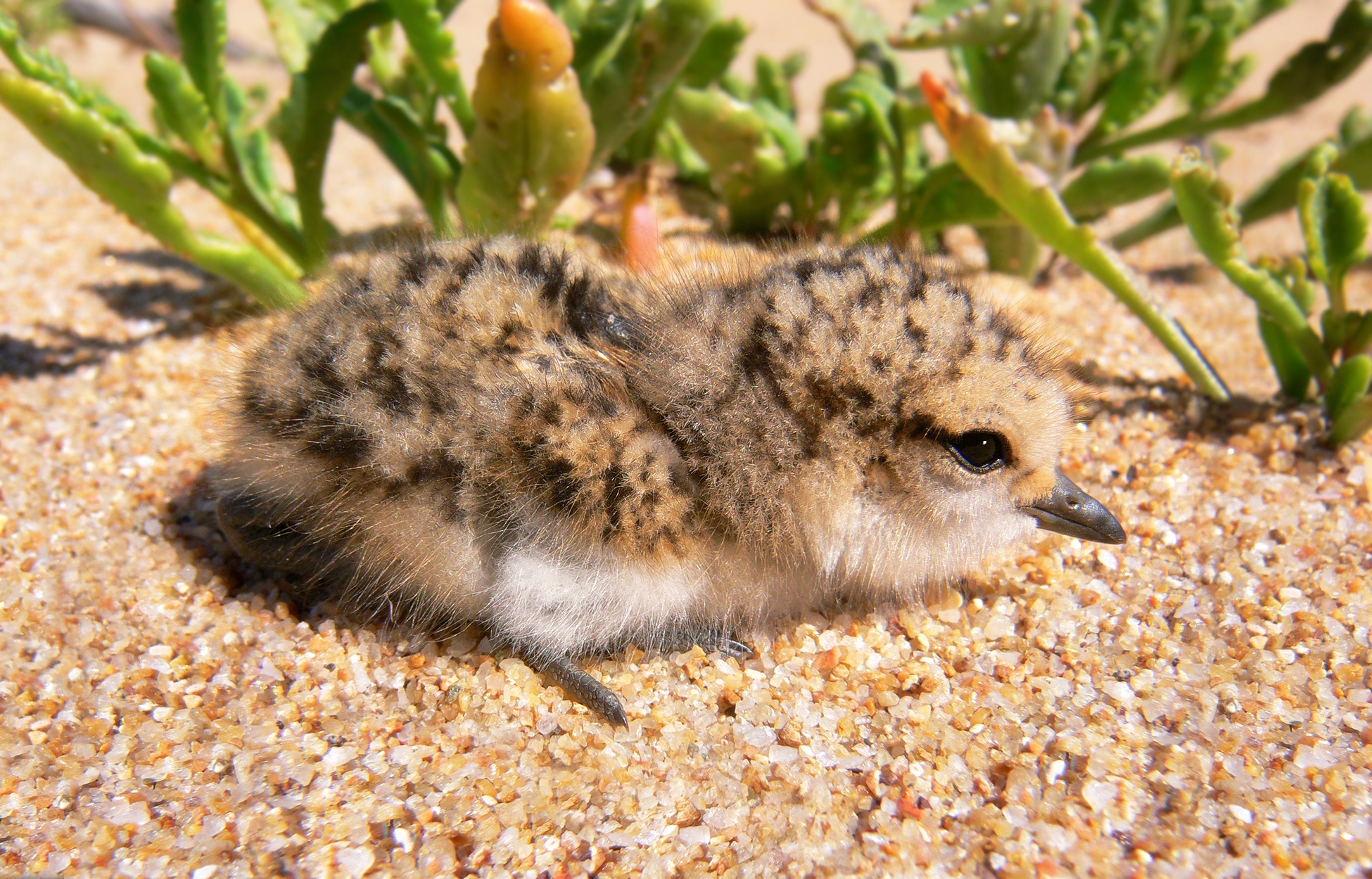
A chick, adopting a camouflaged position that helps it avoid detection by predators such as gulls and crows.

The red-capped plover is a seasonal breeder on the coasts of Australia, but breeds in response to unpredictable rains inland. The plover nests on the ground close to wetlands; the nest is a small depression in the ground, with minimal or no lining. The clutch of two pale yellowish-brown eggs are speckled with black spots. The Incubation period is 30 days; incubating is mainly done by the female. Upon hatching, the young are open-eyed, mobile, and relatively mature (precocial); they flee the nest shortly after birth (nidifugous).

== Conservation ==
With a large range and no evidence of significant population decline, this species' conservation status is of Least Concern.
