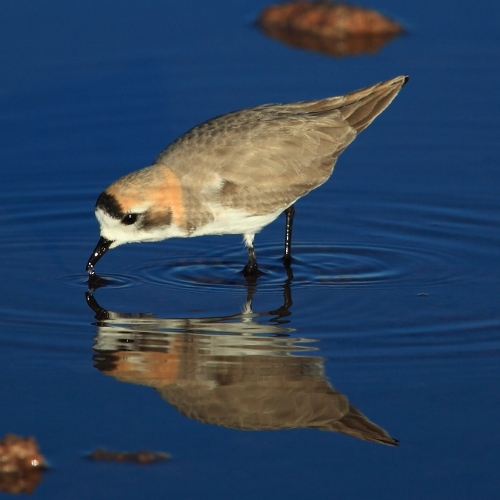
- Puna plover at Salar de Atacama, Antofagasta Region, Chile

Conservation status
- Least Concern (IUCN 3.1)

Scientific classification
- Kingdom: Animalia
- Phylum: Chordata
- Class: Aves
- Order: Charadriiformes
- Family: Charadriidae
- Genus: Anarhynchus
- Species: A. alticola

Binomial name
- Anarhynchus alticola (Berlepsch & Stolzmann, 1902)

= Puna plover =

Species of bird

The puna plover (Anarhynchus alticola) is a species of bird in subfamily Charadriinae of family Charadriidae. It is found in Argentina, Bolivia, Chile, and Peru.

== Taxonomy and systematics ==
The puna plover has at times been considered conspecific with the two-banded plover (A. falklandicus) but now some treat the two as a superspecies. The puna plover is monotypic.

== Description ==
The puna plover is 16.5 to 17.5 cm (6.5 to 6.9 in) long and weighs 41 to 49 g (1.4 to 1.7 oz). It has a short thick neck and its bill and legs are black. Adult males have a white face. They have a black bar on the forecrown and a black strip behind the eye that connects to black patches on the sides of the breast. They have a pale chestnut crown, hindneck, and breast band. Their upperparts are dull brown and their underparts white but for the breast band. Adult females are duller; their breast band can be grayish and the areas that are black on the male can be brownish. Juveniles are essentially brown above and white below, with little or none of the adults' black and chestnut.

== Distribution and habitat ==
The puna plover is found in the high Andes from Peru's Department of Junín south through western Bolivia into northern Chile as far as the Atacama Region and into northwestern Argentina to Catamarca Province. It inhabits the plateaus of the puna zone, where it is typically found in short grassland around both salt- and freshwater lakes. In elevation it mostly ranges between 3,000 and 4,500 m (9,800 and 14,800 ft) but is found as low as 2,400 m (7,900 ft) and as high as 5,000 m (16,000 ft). The puna plover is probably resident in most of its range but some move to lower elevations, even as far as the coast, during the austral winter.

== Behavior ==
=== Feeding ===
Almost nothing is known about the puna plover's foraging techniques or diet, but the latter does include small crustaceans. In the non-breeding season it can forage in loose flocks of up to about 30 birds.

=== Breeding ===
The puna plover's egg season is mainly September and October though it can extend to January. The clutch of two to four eggs is laid on short matted grass. The incubation period and time to fledging are not known.

=== Vocalization ===
The puna plover is not highly vocal. What is thought to be its display song is "a repeated phrase of two notes followed by a gravelly trill, e.g. 'pit-pit-krrrrrt... pit-pit-krrrrrt...'." It also makes " a short, emphatic 'pit'" that may be rapidly repeated.

== Status ==
The IUCN has assessed the puna plover as being of Least Concern. It has a large range, but its population size and trend are not known. No immediate threats have been identified. It is considered rather common in the central and southern parts of its range.
