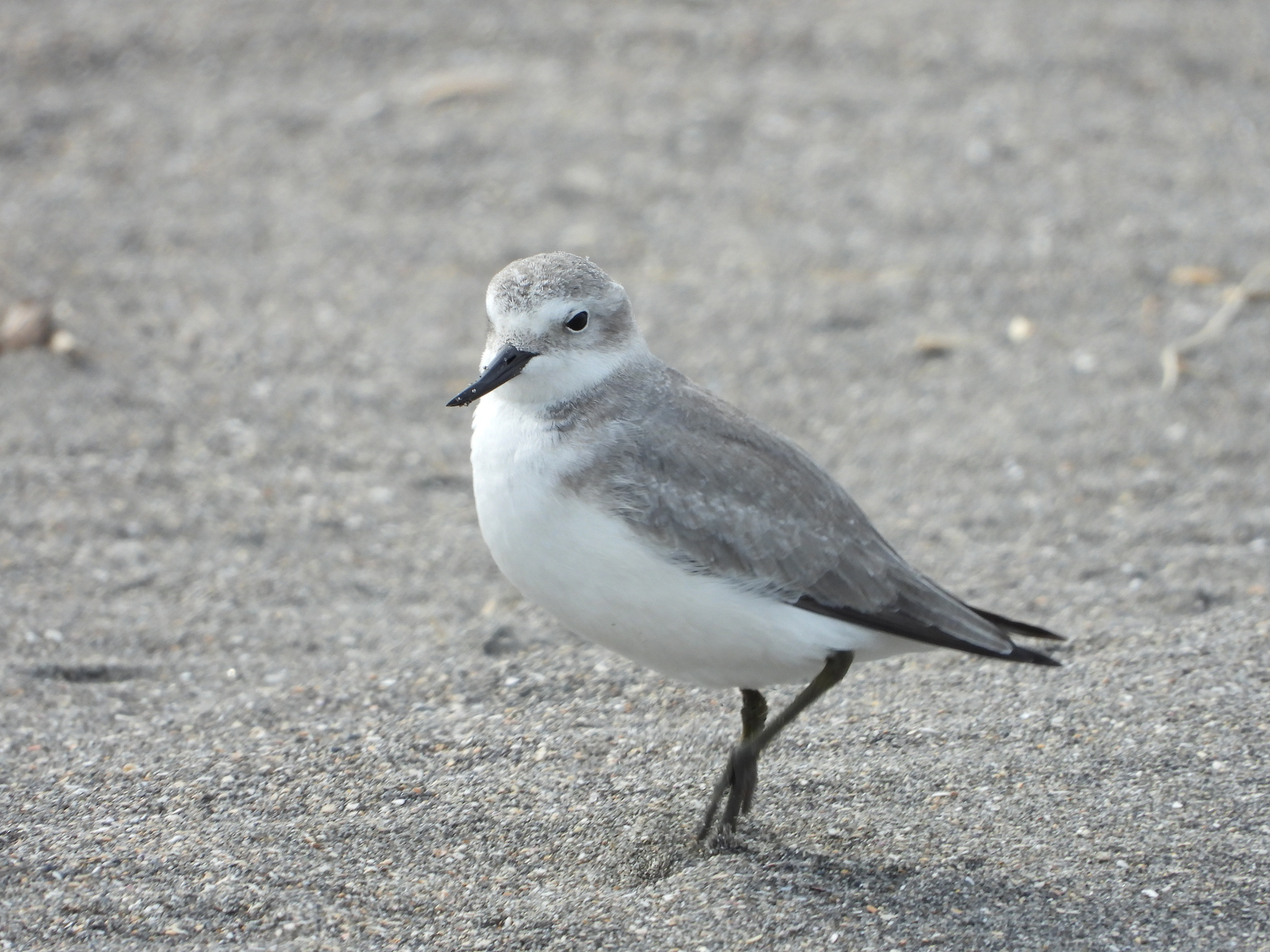
- Wrybill, photographed in New Zealand

Scientific classification
- Kingdom: Animalia
- Phylum: Chordata
- Class: Aves
- Order: Charadriiformes
- Family: Charadriidae
- Subfamily: Charadriinae
- Genus: Anarhynchus; Quoy & Gaimard, 1832

Type species
- Anarhynchus frontalis Quoy & Gaimard, 1832

= Anarhynchus =

Genus of birds

Anarhynchus is a genus of plovers consisting of 24 species.

Many Anarhynchus species are characterised by partial collars, rather than full breast bands or collars which are characteristic of Charadrius.

== Taxonomy ==
French naturalists Jean René Constant Quoy and Joseph Paul Gaimard described this genus to accommodate the Wrybill. The name is from Ancient Greek ana- (ἀνα-, means "backward") and rhunkhos (ῥυγχος, means "bill").

Anarhynchus was previously considered monotypic, consisting only of the wrybill. Studies in 2015 and 2022 confirmed that Charadrius is polyphyletic, with some species more closely related to the wrybill rather than the common ringed plover. In IOC 14.1, 23 species were transferred to this genus. Anarhynchus now contains the following species:

- Caspian plover, Anarhynchus asiaticus (Pallas, 1773)
- Oriental plover, Anarhynchus veredus (Gould, 1848)
- Tibetan sand plover, Anarhynchus atrifrons (Wagler, 1829)
- Siberian sand plover, Anarhynchus mongolus (Pallas, 1776)
- Greater sand plover, Anarhynchus leschenaultii (Lesson, RP, 1826)
- Double-banded plover, Anarhynchus bicinctus (Jardine & Selby, 1827)
- Wrybill, Anarhynchus frontalis Quoy & Gaimard, 1832
- New Zealand plover, Anarhynchus obscurus (Gmelin, JF, 1789)
  - Northern New Zealand dotterel, Anarhynchus obscurus aquilonius (Dowding, 1994)
- Wilson's plover, Anarhynchus wilsonia (Ord, 1814)
- Collared plover, Anarhynchus collaris (Vieillot, 1818)
- Mountain plover, Anarhynchus montanus (Townsend, JK, 1837)
- Puna plover, Anarhynchus alticola (Berlepsch & Stolzmann, 1902)
- Two-banded plover, Anarhynchus falklandicus (Latham, 1790)
- Madagascar plover, Anarhynchus thoracicus (Richmond, 1896)
- Kittlitz's plover, Anarhynchus pecuarius (Temminck, 1823)
- Saint Helena plover, Anarhynchus sanctaehelenae (Harting, 1873)
- Red-capped plover, Anarhynchus ruficapillus (Temminck, 1821)
- Snowy plover, Anarhynchus nivosus (Cassin, 1858)
- Chestnut-banded plover, Anarhynchus pallidus (Strickland, 1853)
- Malaysian plover, Anarhynchus peronii (Schlegel, 1865)
- White-fronted plover, Anarhynchus marginatus (Vieillot, 1818)
- Javan plover, Anarhynchus javanicus (Chasen, 1938)
- Kentish plover, Anarhynchus alexandrinus (Linnaeus, 1758)
- White-faced plover, Anarhynchus dealbatus (Swinhoe, 1870)
