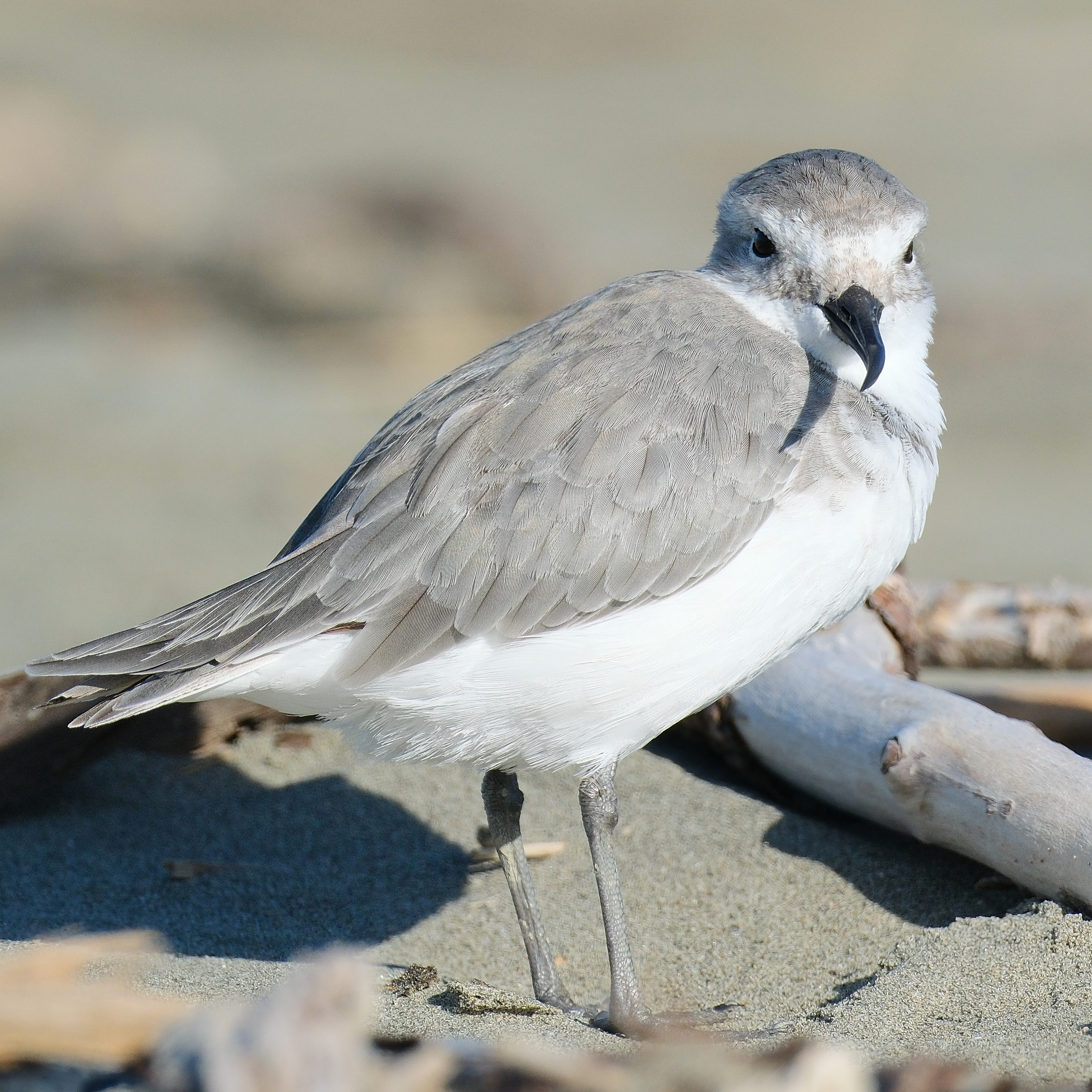
- Wrybill with beak bent to the right

Conservation status
- Vulnerable (IUCN 3.1)

Scientific classification
- Kingdom: Animalia
- Phylum: Chordata
- Class: Aves
- Order: Charadriiformes
- Family: Charadriidae
- Genus: Anarhynchus
- Species: A. frontalis

Binomial name
- Anarhynchus frontalis Quoy & Gaimard, 1832

= Wrybill =

Species of bird endemic to New Zealand

The wrybill or wrybill plover (Anarhynchus frontalis) (Māori: ngutuparore) is a species of plover endemic to New Zealand. It is the only species of bird in the world with a beak that is bent sideways in one direction, always to the right (in the crossbills, e.g. Loxia pytyopsittacus, the tips of the upper and lower mandibles cross because they are bent sideways in opposite directions, sometimes left over right and sometimes right over left). A 2015 study found it to be within the Charadrius clade (although it is now classified in the genus Anarhynchus), with other New Zealand plovers its closest relatives; the nearest being the New Zealand dotterel or New Zealand plover (Anarhynchus obscurus), and then the double-banded plover or banded dotterel (Anarhynchus bicinctus).

It lays its eggs among the rocks along rivers and distracts intruders by pretending to be in distress and moving away from its clutch.

It is rated as vulnerable on the International Union for Conservation of Nature (IUCN)'s Red List of Threatened Species.

== Taxonomy ==
French naturalists Jean René Constant Quoy and Joseph Paul Gaimard described the wrybill in 1832.

== Description ==
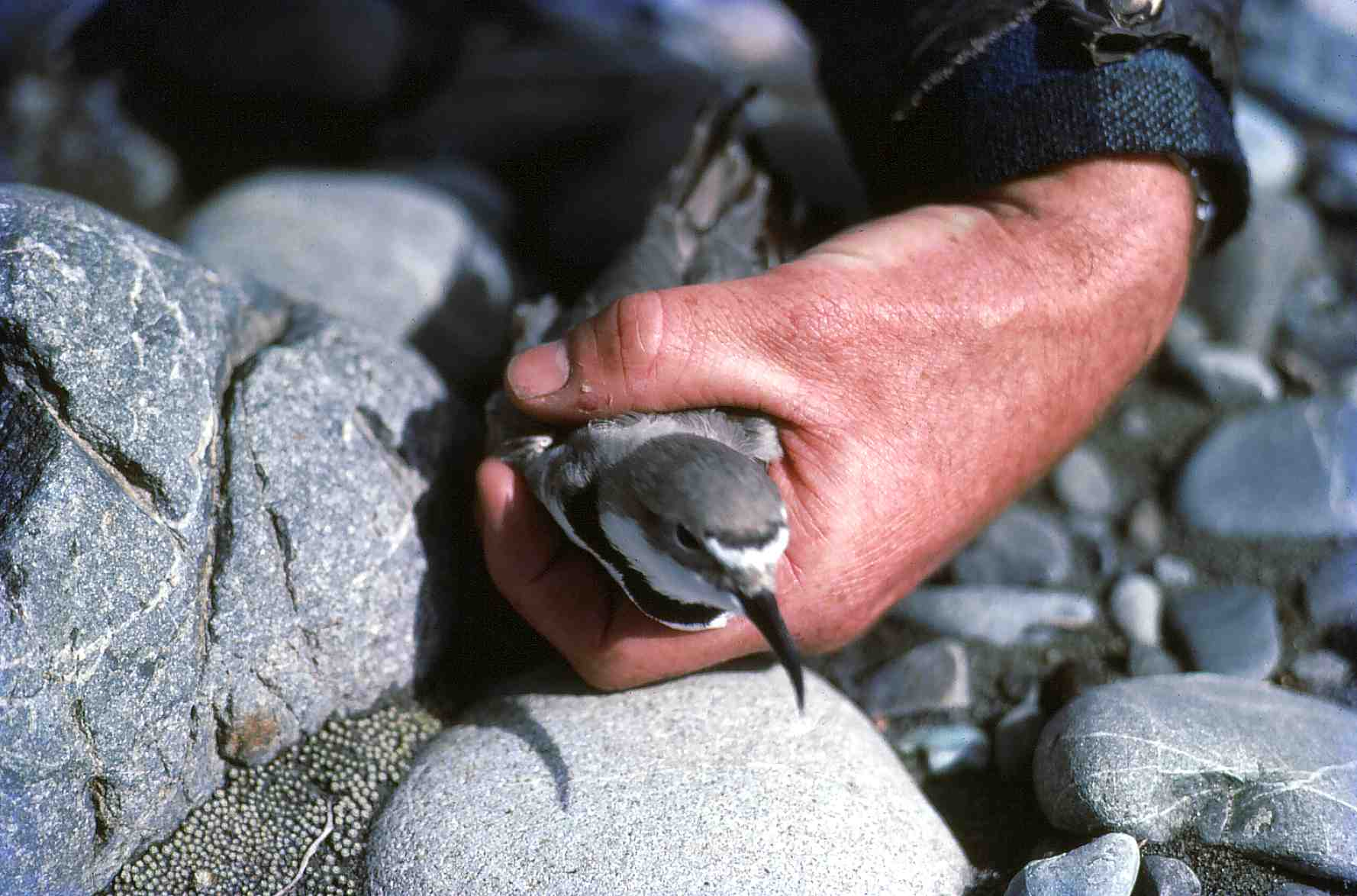
Wrybill female

The wrybill is a small, plump plover, measuring 20 to 21 cm (7.9–8.3 in) in length and weighing between 43 and 71 g (1.5–2.5 oz). The plumage is slightly sexually dimorphic. The male has a white forehead and pale grey crown, nape, back, wings and tail and a white throat, breast, belly and rump, with a thin black band across the breast. This band is thinner in the female, and much less distinct in both sexes in the non-breeding season. The other difference between the sexes is a small black bar between the white forehead and the grey crown, which is present in the males but not the females. As with the breast band it is reduced in the non-breeding season. The most distinctive feature of the bird is the long black bill, which is always curved to the right. The wrybill is the only species of bird with an asymmetrically turned bill. The eggs are very pale grey and covered with very small brown spots which blend in very well to the surrounding shingle. As well as the eggs being very well camouflaged, the adult birds and chicks are very difficult to see when they are standing still. Chicks are very pale grey on upper half of body with black speckles and white on lower half of body grey.

The wrybill's voice has been described as a short weet when in flight and used to signal alarm, and a harsher call is used to signal greater alarm. A chirring sound is used to challenge an aggressor. Fledglings and juveniles have a high-pitched short peep.

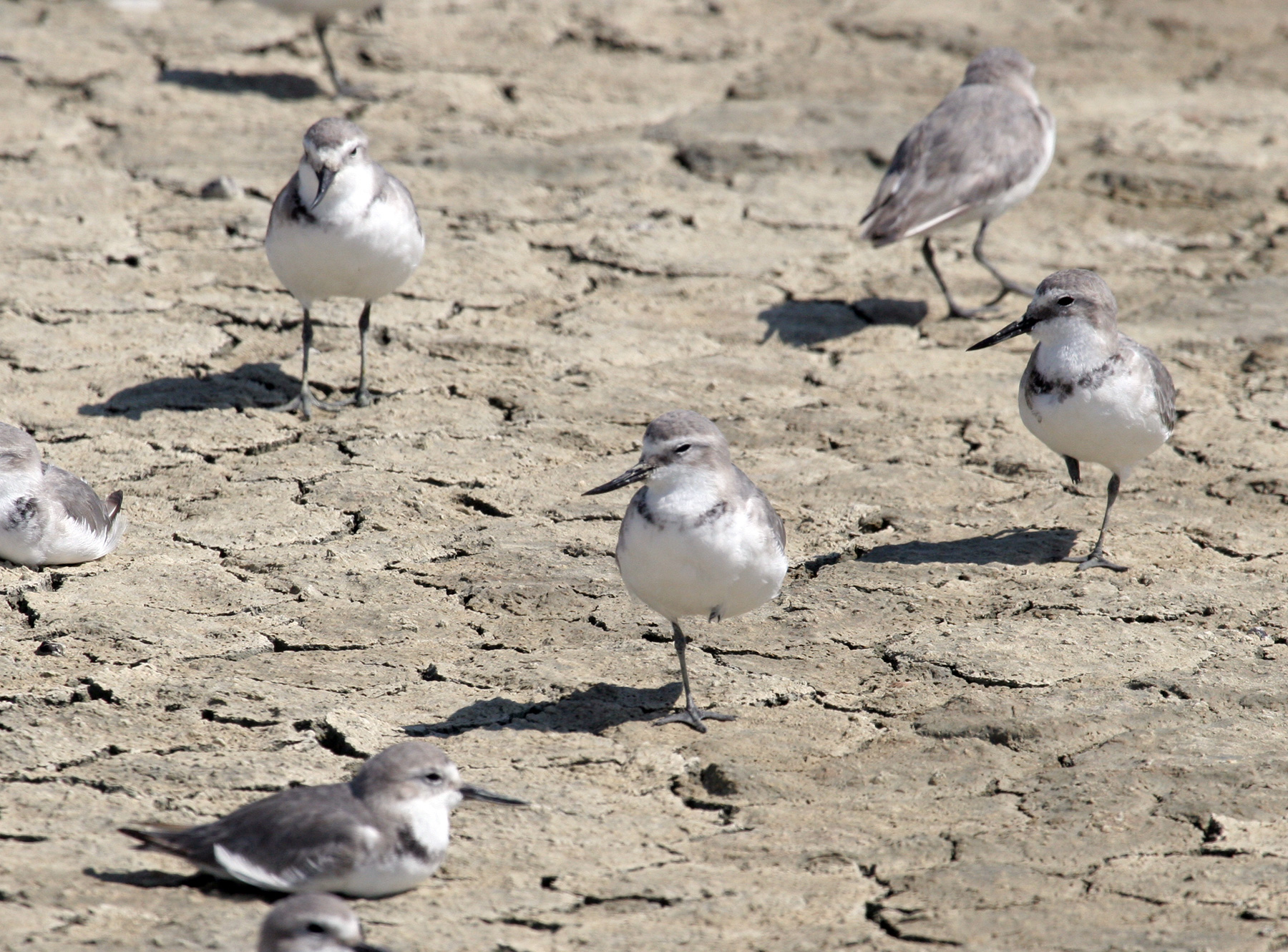
Wrybills on mud flat, Firth of Thames

== Distribution and habitat ==
The wrybill is endemic to New Zealand. It breeds on large braided rivers in Canterbury and Otago, South Island, preferring large dynamic rivers that will not become overgrown with weeds. The main breeding rivers include the Waimakariri, Rakaia, Rangitata, Waitaki and Ashley. It used to occur more frequently on smaller rivers, but has undergone a range contraction, and now only occupies around 60% of its estimated original range. After breeding, around late December till early February, they leave their breeding sites and migrate to shallow estuaries and sheltered coastal areas in the North Island. These areas include Firth of Thames, Manukau Harbour, Kaipara Harbour and Tauranga Harbour.

== Behaviour ==
Wrybills like to roost in large flocks during winter which differs greatly from breeding time when they become very territorial towards other birds. They usually roost on one leg and hop away when approached too close.

Wrybills are known to perform large aerial displays with their flocks. This usually happens shortly before the migration south.

=== Breeding ===
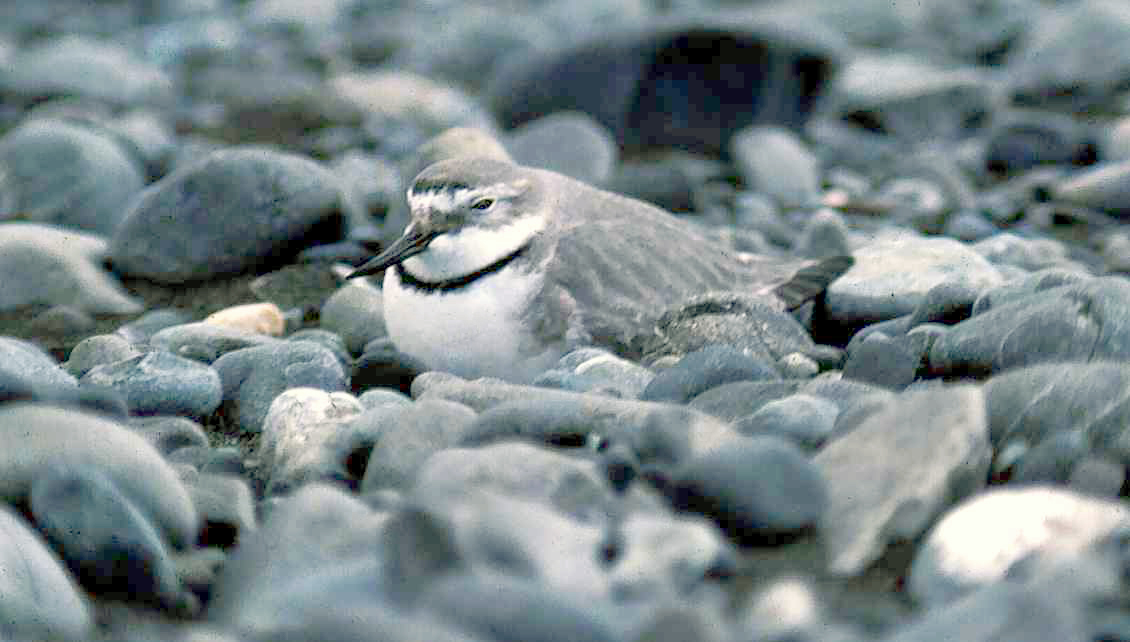
Wrybill sitting on eggs

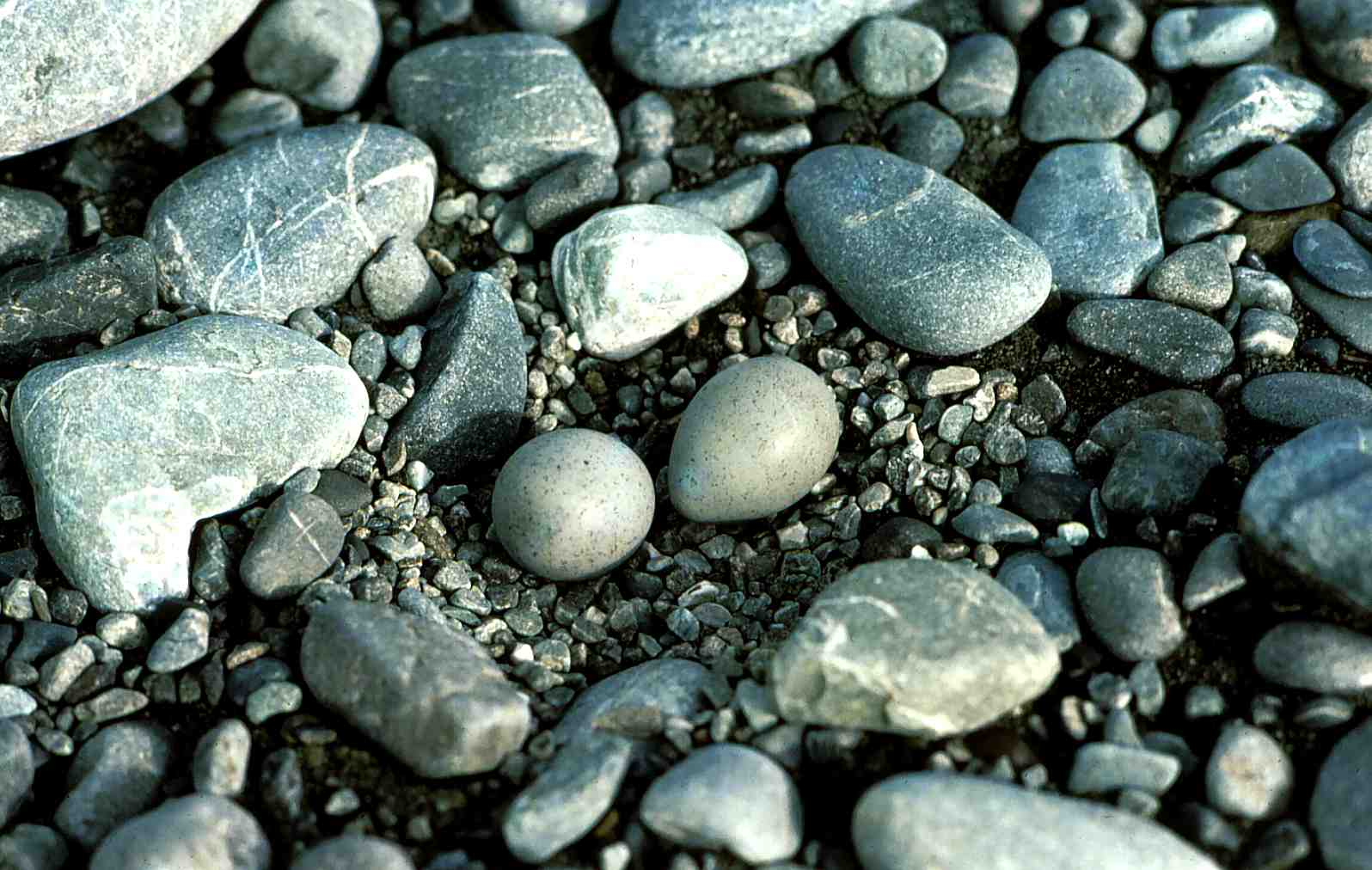
Wrybill eggs showing camouflage

Wrybills form monogamous bonds with their mates and will return to the same territory each year to breed again. If their mate does not return, the bird will move territories. Nesting territories are strongly defended. These can be anywhere between 1 and 11 hectares in size, with an average size of 5 hectares. They show strong philopatry to their territories, and young birds show strong philopatric tendencies towards breeding close to where they were hatched. Many breeding pairs will lay two clutches in a breeding season, especially if the first clutch was destroyed by flooding or predators.

Nesting sites are shallow scrapes in areas of large stones or sand. The clutch size is two eggs, which are incubated by both parents (but more so by the female) for 30 to 36 days. The chicks have downy feathers on hatching, grey to off-white above and white underneath. Both parents attend to the chicks, which fledge after around 35 days and are immediately independent after this. Young birds start breeding when they are two years old.

=== Ecology ===
Moulting of wrybills happens between December and May. The moulting process advances quickly at the start of the process, when the first feathers are dropped, and slows as the longer outer feathers start to grow. Migration starts in November with the earliest fledged birds. Adults follow in January–February when breeding is finished with the rest of the fledglings. Migration back to breeding sites in the South Island happens in August. The current population is around 5000 individuals.

== Diet and foraging ==
Wrybills are usually found foraging around shallow channels and around the edges of pools on insect larvae, aquatic invertebrates and sometimes small fish. They have evolved in a very distinct way to thrive on braided river beds: their beak is slightly tilted towards the right at an angle of about 12–26 degrees which is speculated to help them get insect larvae and small invertebrates that take refuge under the crevices of rocks; however this has never been conclusively proven.

== Predators and threats ==
Threats are higher during the breeding season when the birds are at their most vulnerable. Threats include predation, flooding during nesting time, habitat degradation and disturbance from vehicles along the river beds. Introduced mammalian predators such as ferrets, stoats, weasels and hedgehogs pose a significant threat to the survival of the remaining population. Wrybills have adapted to bird predators such as raptors, gulls and owls, since mammalian predators have only been a threat since the arrival of people. Their chicks and eggs blend in very well with the surrounding shingle, camouflaging them from the predators flying overhead. Since rabbits are the main diet of introduced mammalian predators, when rabbit numbers are low these predators search further for their food and prey upon the ground nesting birds on the braided rivers. Flooding can destroy nests and disturb whole nesting areas, and can affect the number of chicks to reach fledging. As wrybills prefer an open clear area of shingle on the river bed to nest, introduced plant species such as gorse (Ulex europaeus), willow (Salix spp.), broom (Cytisus scoparius) and lupin (Lupinus spp.), all threaten the wrybill's habitat as they spread over the landscape easily and quickly.

== Conservation status ==
The wrybill is rated as vulnerable on the International Union for Conservation of Nature (IUCN)'s Red List of Threatened Species,

The population declined during the 1800s as they were collected as museum specimens because of their strangely bent bill. In 1940 they were protected and the population has increased from around 2000 birds to 5000 birds today.
