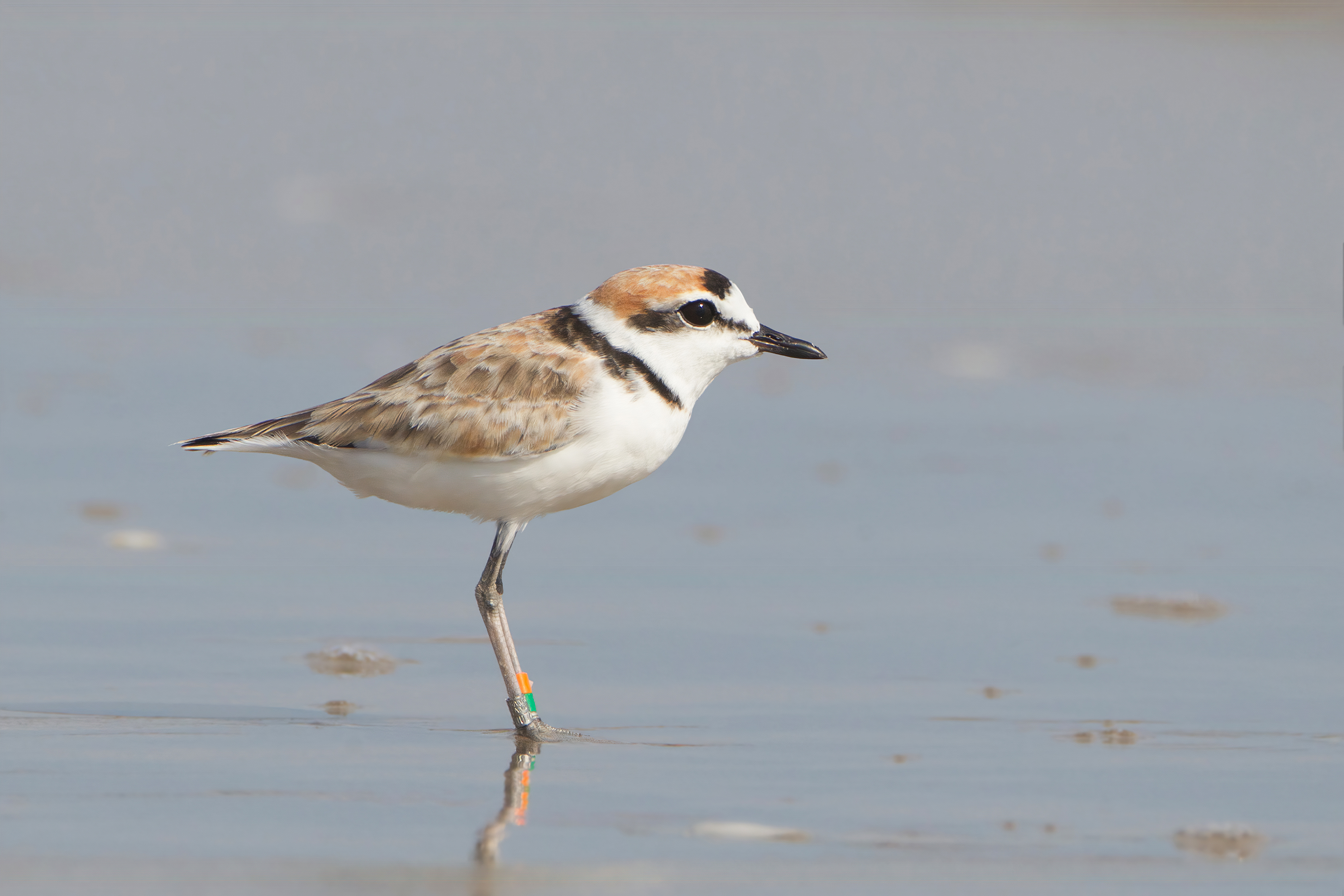
- male
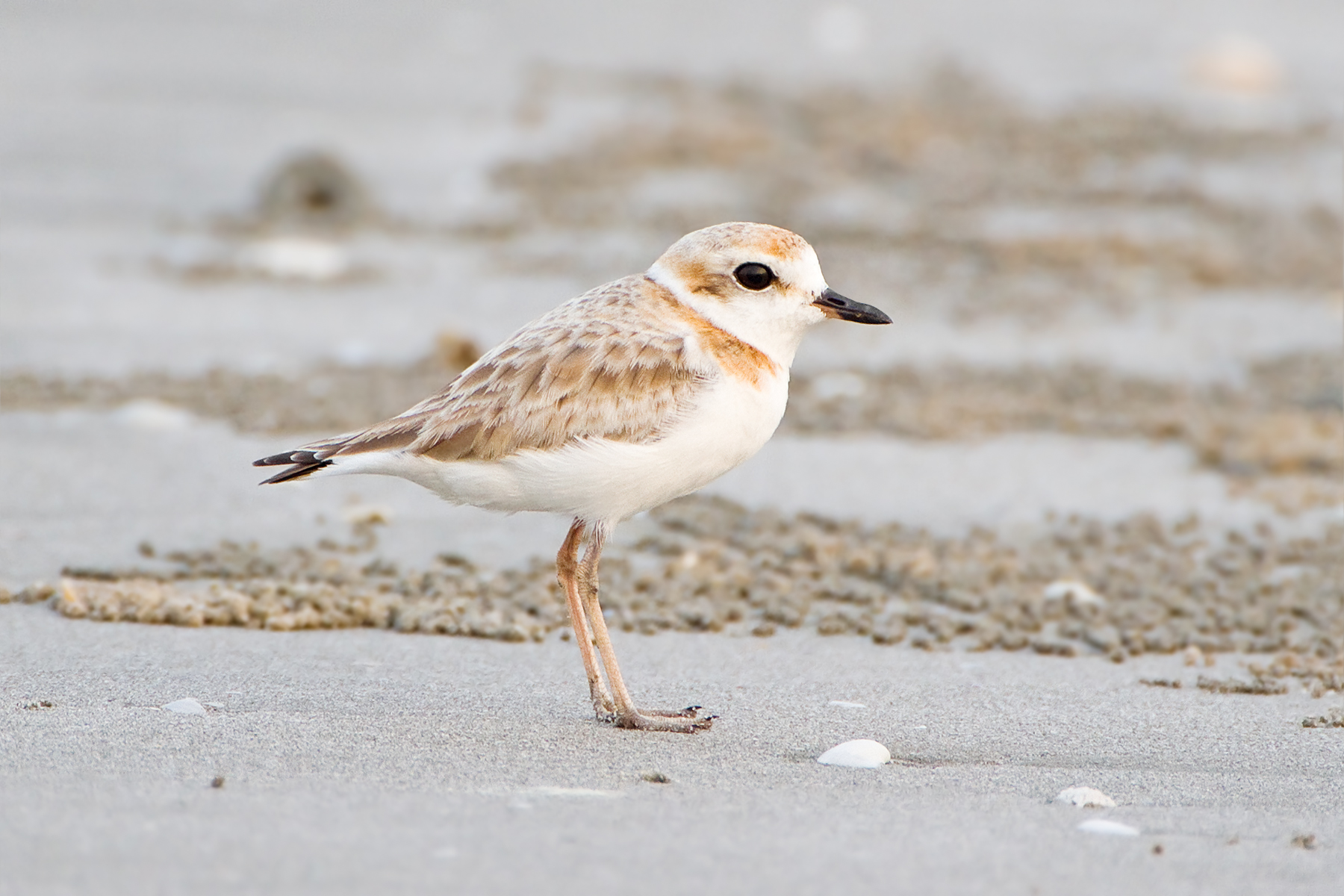
- female

Conservation status
- Near Threatened (IUCN 3.1)

Scientific classification
- Kingdom: Animalia
- Phylum: Chordata
- Class: Aves
- Order: Charadriiformes
- Family: Charadriidae
- Genus: Anarhynchus
- Species: A. peronii

Binomial name
- Anarhynchus peronii (Schlegel, 1865)

= Malaysian plover =

Species of bird

The Malaysian plover or Malay plover (Anarhynchus peronii, syn. Charadrius peronii) is a small (c. 35–42 g) wader that nests on beaches and salt flats in Southeast Asia.

== Description ==
The Malaysian plover is 15 cm (5.9 in) in length. The male can be recognized by a thin black band around the neck; the female has a thin brown band. Its legs are pale. Its voice is a soft twit.

== Reproduction ==
The Malaysian plover lays two to five (mode of three) cryptic eggs on small scrapes on beaches. The eggs are incubated by both the male and female for about 30 days, and then both parents care for the precocial chicks until they can fly after about 30 more days. In Thailand, it may lay multiple clutches after successful or failed clutching during the breeding season which begins in late March and may last until September. It feeds on invertebrates on the beaches and mudflats.

== Conservation status ==
This species is classified as near-threatened with about 10,000 individuals. They are thought to be declining because of infrastructure development and human disturbance. Increased human use of important beach habitat may cause trampling of eggs or chicks and also force adults off of nests so that eggs and chicks are vulnerable to heat stress. A study in the Gulf of Thailand suggested that the conversion of short, shrubby, dense vegetation into sparse Casuarina forests as well as the creation of sea walls that prevent chicks from moving between foraging areas on the mudflat and hiding habitats in the vegetation behind the beaches, could reduce habitat quality for Malaysian plovers.

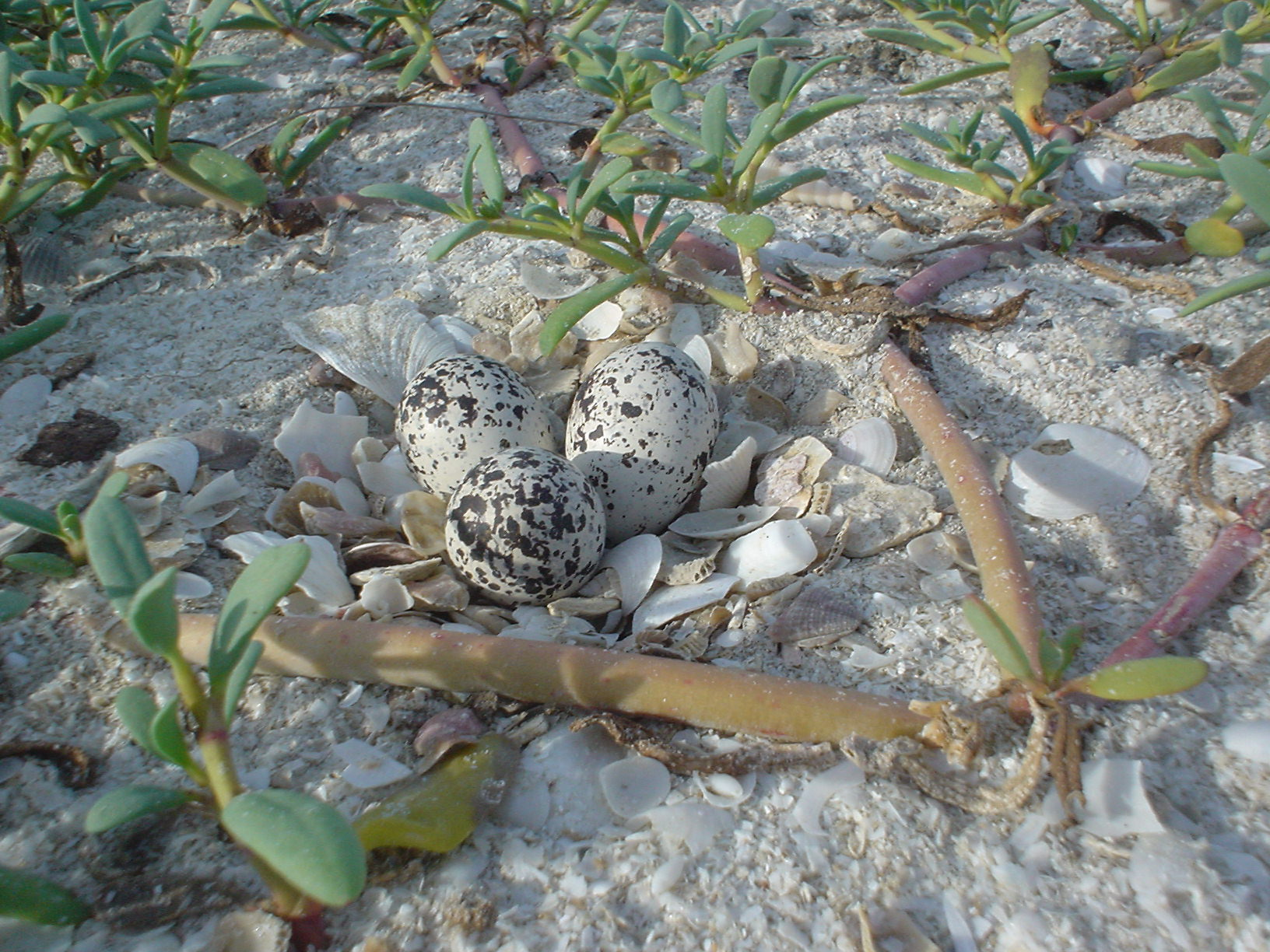
A Malaysian plover nest

Sandy tropical beaches have tremendous economic value and as a result there has been intensive development pressure on the remaining Malaysian plover habitats in Thailand. This is likely to continue as the Thai economy continues to improve from the Asian financial crisis and the domestic tourist market expands. The main remaining large populations of Malaysian plovers in Thailand are in Khao Sam Roi Yot National Park (Thailand's first marine protected area), and beaches around Bonok village both in Prachuap Khiri Khan province and Laem Phak Bia in Petchburi province. Bonok made headlines in the Thai and international media when a prominent environmental activist (Charoen Wataksorn) who helped to protect one of these undeveloped beaches from the construction of a coal power plant, was murdered after protesting against illegal land grabs on one of these beaches. The construction of a seawall in 2005 in Laem Phak Bia (a sandy, 1 km (.62 mi) long spit in Petchburi province) is likely to have significantly altered the habitat.

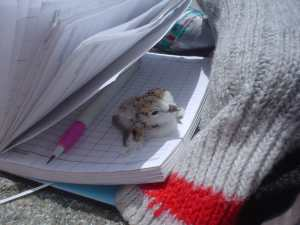
A Malaysian plover chick

A study published in 2006 attempted to assess the impact of tourism on the species through a large-scale survey in Prachuap Khiri Khan and Petchburi, Thailand; 193 adults and 191 chicks were color-banded as part of the study. The study concluded that "tourism development on Thai beaches affects both habitat availability and productivity of Malaysian plovers by enhancing beach erosion rates, converting medium vegetation into tall monocultures and intensifying human disturbance. These direct effects of habitat loss may be exacerbated by density-dependent reductions in productivity."
