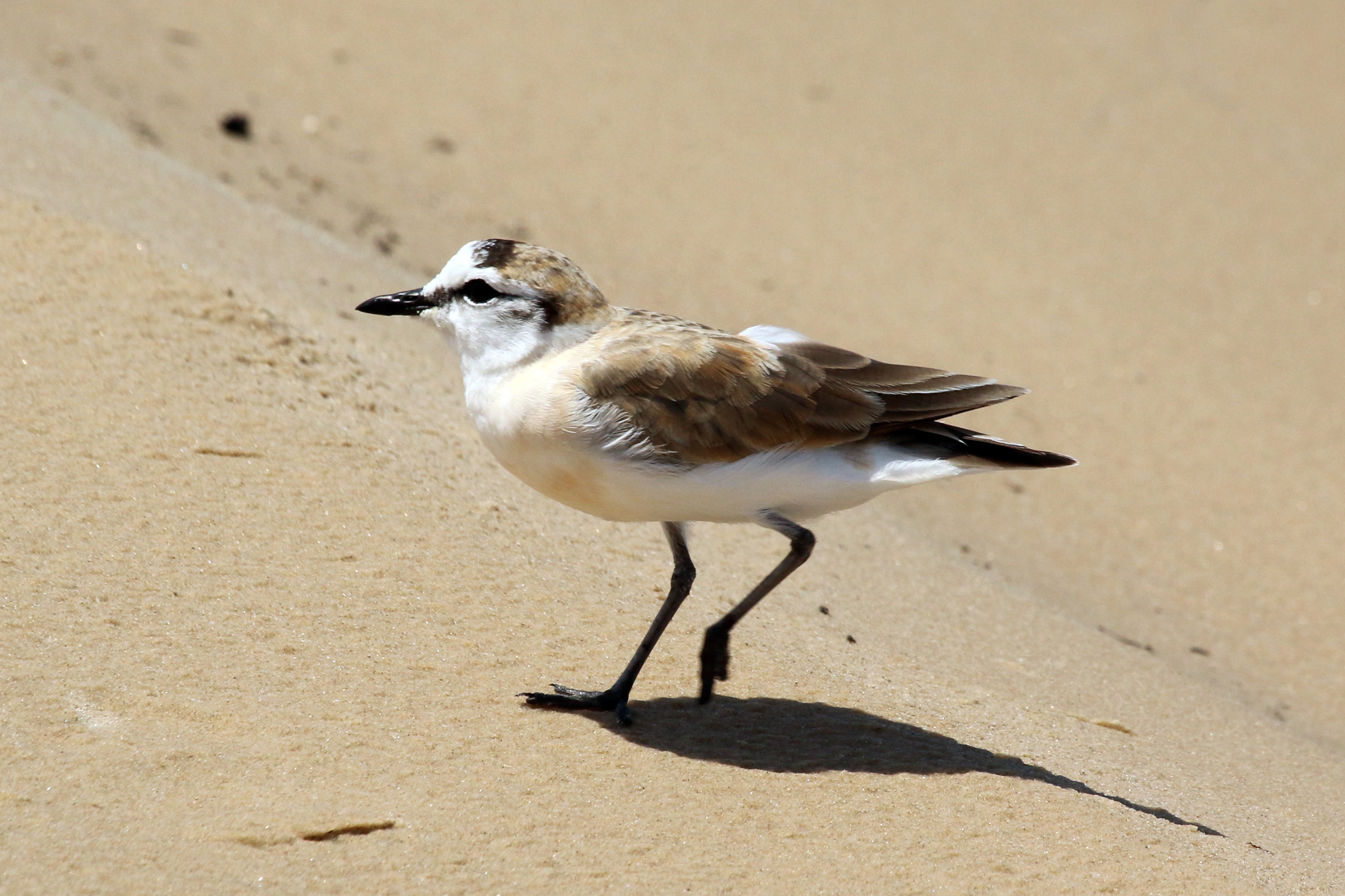
- At iSimangaliso Wetland Park, KwaZulu Natal, South Africa

Conservation status
- Least Concern (IUCN 3.1)

Scientific classification
- Kingdom: Animalia
- Phylum: Chordata
- Class: Aves
- Order: Charadriiformes
- Family: Charadriidae
- Genus: Anarhynchus
- Species: A. marginatus

Binomial name
- Anarhynchus marginatus (Vieillot, 1818)

Synonyms
- Charadrius marginatus

= White-fronted plover =

Species of shorebird of the family Charadriidae from Sub-Saharan Africa and Madagascar

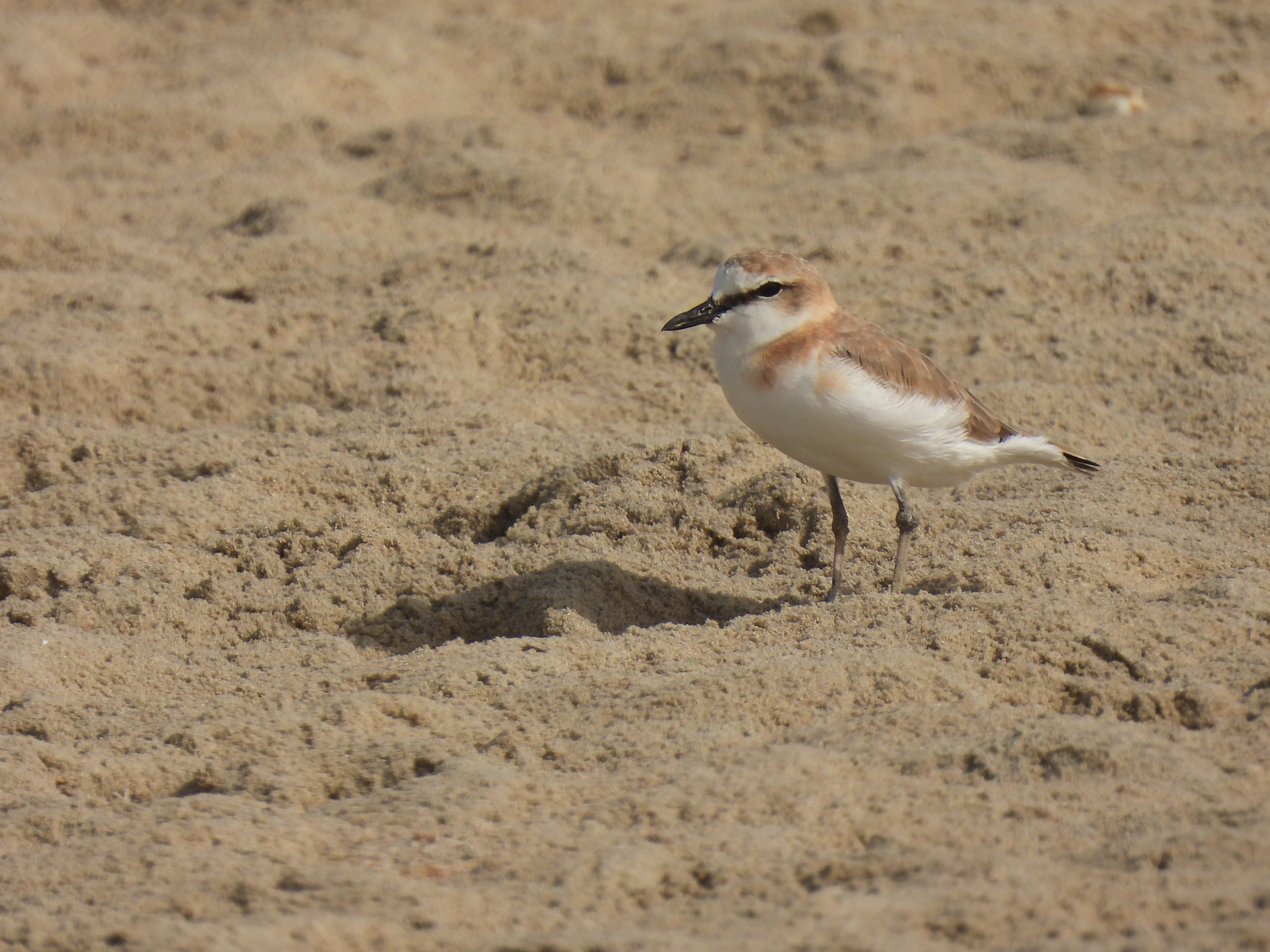
White-fronted plover (Anarhynchus marginatus), The Gambia, 2021

The white-fronted plover or white-fronted sandplover (Anarhynchus marginatus) is a small (45-50 g) shorebird of the family Charadriidae that inhabits sandy beaches, dunes, mudflats and the shores of rivers and lakes in sub-saharan Africa and Madagascar. It nests in small shallow scrapes in the ground and lays clutches of one to three eggs. The species is monogamous and long-lived, with a life expectancy of approximately 12 years. The vast majority of pairs that mate together stay together during the following years of breeding and retain the same territory. The white-fronted plover has a similar appearance to the Kentish plover, with a white fore crown and dark bands connecting the eyes to the bill.

== Subspecies ==
Four or five subspecies are recognized, which vary in the colour shade of the neck collar and breast:

- A. m. arenaceus (Clancey, 1971) occurs from southern Mozambique to the south-western Cape Province in South Africa.
- A. m. marginatus (Vieillot, 1818), the nominate subspecies, occurs from southern Angola to the south-western Cape Province.
- A. m. mechowi (Cabanis, 1884) occurs locally in Africa south of the Sahara to northern Angola, Botswana, Zimbabwe and northern Mozambique.
- A. m. tenellus (Hartlaub, 1861) is endemic to Madagascar.
- A. m. pons is a subspecies that is not currently accepted by all authorities.

== Description ==
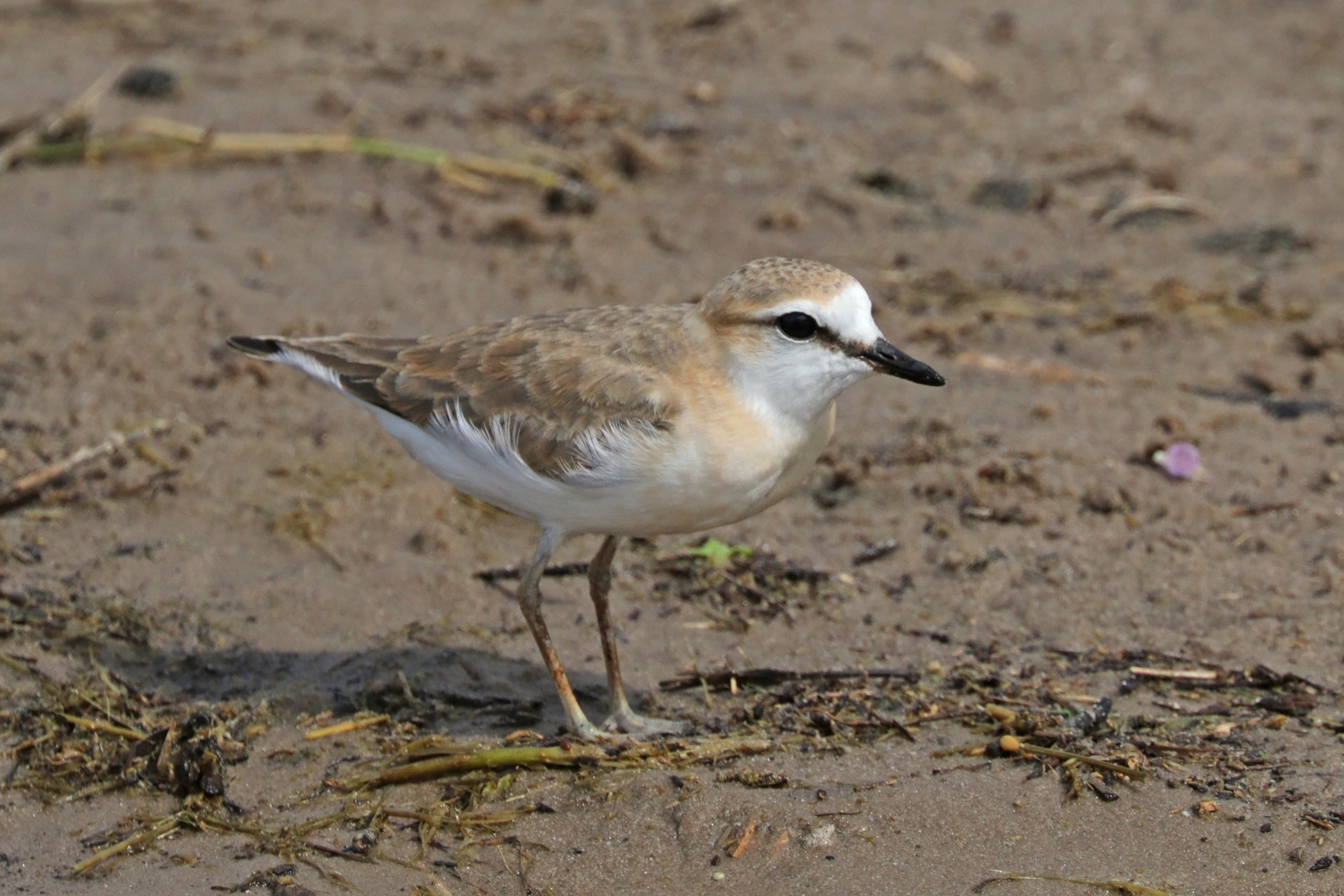
juvenile, Chobe National Park, Namibia

The average white-fronted plover weighs approximately 45-50 g, and the two sexes differ slightly in plumage coloration. Adult male plovers show a white forecrown and supercilium, with a dark band crossing the mid crown, with the rest of the crown a sandy grey colour. The face is mainly white, with a blackish brown stripe running from behind the eye to the ear coverts. The mantle, back, and rump is light greyish brown, with pale brown to grey fringing feathers. The upper covert and central feathers of the tail are black, and the lateral feathers are white. Primaries and secondaries are dark brown with white shafts, bases, and inner webs. White-fronted plovers also have a pale dusky-brown lateral patch on the upper breast, and white underparts, occasionally with a washed chestnut lower breast and upper belly. The eyes are brown, the bill is black, and the legs are pale grey, green-grey, or pale green/olive. Adult females have a similar appearance to adult males, however the black crown band is less defined and not as thick, and may even be absent in some cases. Additionally, the wing of the females is slightly longer than that of the males. Juveniles have similar markings to adult females, but always lack the crown band altogether, and there is no black colouration on the head- lores are brown. The lateral breast patch is very variable between individuals of this species.

== Calls ==
The voice of a white-fronted plover is often a gentle piping wit, woo-et, twirit, and tirit-tirit, as well as pi-peep. When a plover is defending a territory, a harsh chiza-chiza can be heard, followed by a purrr or squeak. When the incomplete egg set is visited, a croo sound is called, and during incubation a short clirrup sound or clup is made when alarmed. Other alarm calls consist of kittup and chirrrt. Adult courtship is a sharp krewwwwww, and freshly hatched chicks often call a tsick, to get the attention of their parent.

== Distribution, movement and habitat ==
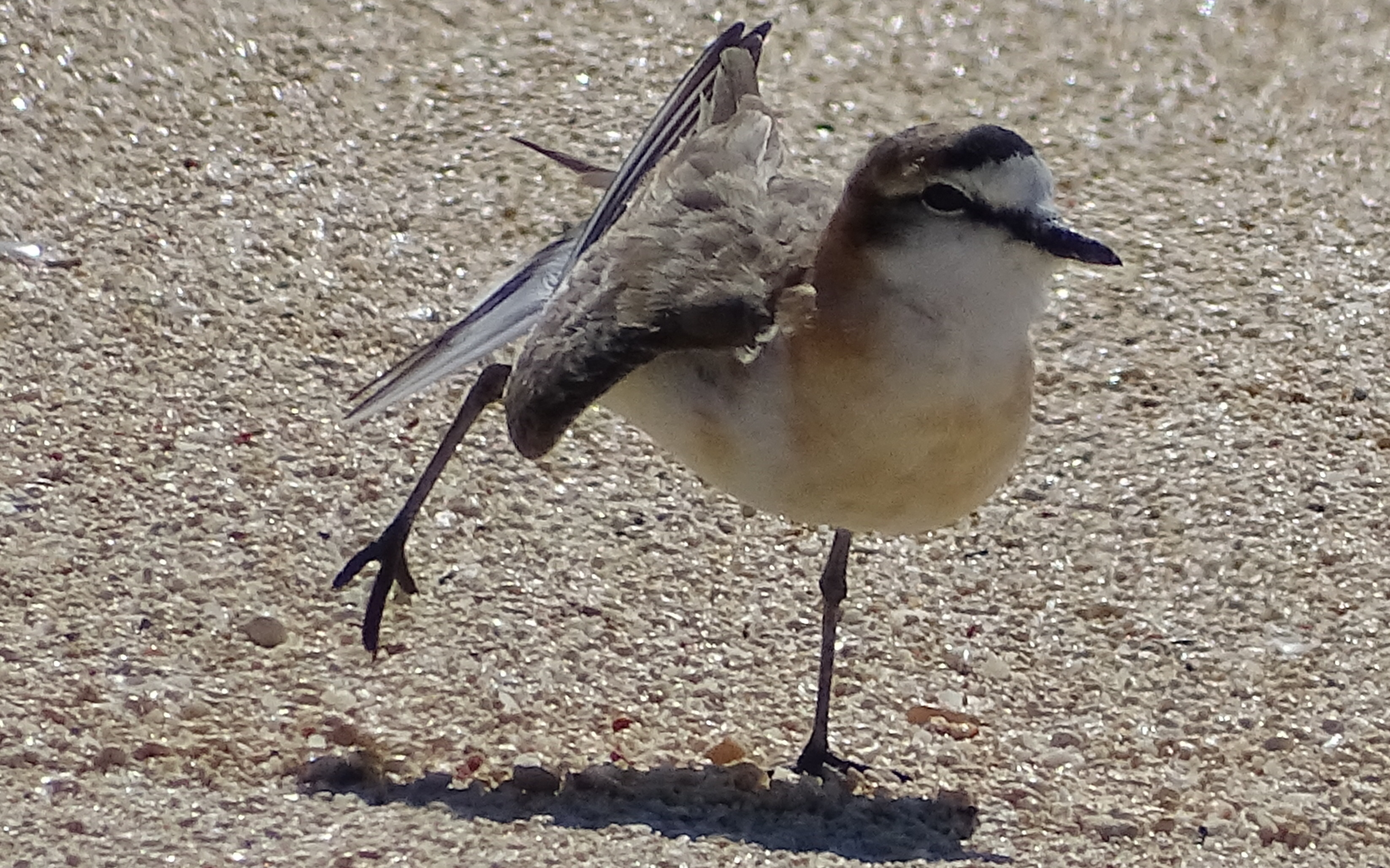
White-fronted plover on the hot sands of Nosy Be, south-western Madagascar

=== Distribution ===
The white-fronted plover is endemic to sub-saharan Africa, and occurs at varying densities from Senegambia and Somalia to South Africa. The species is present along the entire South African coast and is also found inland, near large lakes and rivers. It also inhabits Madagascar. In Madagascar, breeding populations are resident on all coasts, and also inland. A genetic study reported genetic differentiation between Madagascar and the mainland population.

=== Movement ===
The white-fronted plover has both resident and partially migratory populations, with some birds undertaking local seasonal movements. The coastal populations are largely sedentary, but occasionally move to more sheltered shores from exposed areas during harsh winters. Flooding of the lakes or the shores that they inhabit might urge inland populations to migrate. Birds mostly leave from December to May, moving from their inland habitats to the East coast of South Africa.

=== Habitat ===
The species predominantly inhabits sandy shores, coastal dunes, estuaries, river and lake shores, intertidal mudflats or rocky coasts. It prefers to nests away from the water on open shorelines or on exposed sand among dry kelp wrack. It also nests on sandy shores, near both alkaline and fresh water inland rivers and lakes.

== Feeding ==
The white-fronted plover forages during both day and night, using the typical plover run-stop-search technique. This consists of running around, stopping suddenly to peck at an item and then running again. Prey can be pecked from the surface of water, or caught with shallow jabs, inserting less than half of the bill into the substratum. Another method used to forage is foot-trembling, which involves vibrating the toes on substratum to disturb small insects or force invertebrates to the surface. This has not been reported in the Malagasy populations. Other feeding techniques include flying up to catch insects, and feeding on insects that wash up on shore after getting caught in water. The main prey of the white-fronted plover are sand flies, grasshoppers, termites, mosquito pupae, fairy shrimp, gastropods, bivalves, isopods, crabs, and other small crustaceans and worms.

Plovers mainly forage in the upper half of the intertidal zone on sandy beaches, along high water lines and flooded depressions of dunes in summer. In winter, they forage lower on the shore. They often follow the waves in and out, foraging on the freshly wetted ground. They prefer foraging during low tide, but also in kelp wrack at high tide. In the middle of the day, they often stop foraging to preen. Some individuals defend their feeding territories year round, while others forage in non-territorial flocks, sometimes in mixed-species flocks with sanderlings (Calidris alba) and curlew sandpipers (Calidris ferruginea).

== Behaviour ==
=== Breeding ===
The white-fronted plover is a monogamous solitary breeder with a life expectancy of approximately 12 years, although there is evidence that individuals can live much longer than this. It is usually found in pairs or in small flocks, but can also appear in larger flocks during the breeding season. For example, a flock of 375 individuals was observed in Namibia. Mates generally stay faithful to each other for a long period of time, however 'divorce' has been recorded in some cases. Plovers that have lost mates have been observed to acquire new mates, without losing their territory. This monogamy may be due to a reduced availability of alternative breeding options or possibly high costs of divorce.

Courtship displays include male plovers performing an upright posture accompanied by high stepping movements, while females lower their head. A few shallow nest scapes may be created in the breeding territory before choosing the final nest site. The white-fronted plover is very defensive of its territory. If an intruder invades the territory, the bird puffs out its plumage and chases away the intruder while uttering buzzing calls.

=== Territories ===
Breeding pairs may have one breeding territory close to the high water mark that they are able to feed in, or have two territories that are defended, one for feeding and one for nesting. Nesting territories have an average size of 1.6 ha, and nests can be as close as 16.2 m to each other. The size and boundaries of these territories do not appear to differ much between years of breeding, and site fidelity was recorded as 97.3% for pairs that stayed together between years. Territories are defended against neighbouring birds of the same species, and can also be defended against other species that are in the vicinity, such as sanderlings and Kittlitz's plover (Charadrius pecuarius). Defensive behaviour often consists of low-level aerial attack, running at the intruder with lowered head, or aggressive forward-hunched postures. Non-territorial birds also exist, and as long as they keep to 'ordinary' behaviour pattens (feeding at a specific point and then flying away to a roosting site), the territorial birds appear to tolerate them.

=== Nesting ===
The typical white-fronted plover nest consists of a small shallow scrape in sand, gravel, or shingle, depending on the environment, and is sometimes lined with shell fragments, pebbles, seaweed or twigs. However scrapes are most commonly unlined. Nests are generally more than 70 m above the high water mark. They are often built among beach debris or near dune vegetation. Scrapes are created by the bird pushing its breast into the ground, slowly rotating whilst kicking backwards. Pairs may create more than one crape before choosing one to nest in, as scrape building often overlaps with courtship. 1-3 eggs are laid, with mean clutch size varying for different populations. In South Africa, mean clutch size is 2.05; in Zimbabwe, Zambia, and Malawi, it is 2.53 eggs. Egg laying dates vary between populations, which nest all year round on the coast but only from December to January in inland Namibia. Eggs are laid at 2-7 day intervals and are pale cream coloured, pointed ovals marked with fine blackish brown points and lines. The average dimensions of a white-fronted plover egg are 32.1 x 22.8 mm. Before the clutch is complete, the pair often visit the nest together, and occasionally straddle the egg, however no incubation is undertaken before the final egg is laid. During this joint behaviour, 'croo' calls are made.

=== Incubation ===
Incubation is assumed to start at clutch completion (however this is not confirmed). The incubation period lasts for approximately 27–29 days, but can last up to 33 days. Both sexes incubate the nest during the day, and partly or fully cover the eggs with sand during the day in response to an approaching threat. Egg covering was not found to occur during normal breaks in incubation of the nest but only in response to a threat, and rarely at night. It is therefore hypothesised that egg covering is not related to temperature and insulation of eggs, but rather to predation avoidance. It is thought that the male undertakes the majority of incubation during the night. If a clutch is lost, it is highly likely that a pair will re-lay eggs.

== Parental care ==
The fledging period of chicks is approximately 35–38 days, and the proportion of hatched chicks that actually fledge is estimated to be 28%. If a predator or threat is near, adults with chicks or eggs near hatching date will perform distraction displays such as 'rodent running' and 'injury feigning'. 'Rodent running' consists of the adult running fast, with a low head and a low spread tail, similar to a fleeing rodent. Injury feigning consists of the individual running or cowering on the ground whilst flapping one or both wings, with a partly spread tail. Chicks feed for themselves immediately after hatching, however parents can lead chicks to foraging areas up to 2.2 km from the nest.

The annual adult survival rate for white-fronted plovers is 89-92%. This species is considerably longer lived than their northern relatives.

== Conservation ==
The white-fronted plover is classified as Least Concern by the IUCN due to its extremely large range, large population size, and while total population is decreasing, it appears not to do so at a threatening rate. The Madagascar population is estimated at 5,000–15,000 individuals (coastal surveys from Analalava to Tolagnaro yielded a total count of 1,457 individuals at 119 different locations), the global population at 73,500–103,500. Low nesting success may be partially compensated by multiple clutching and repeat nesting after egg loss, but overall there are too few data to reliably estimates population trends.

=== Threats ===
The main threat to the white-fronted plover is habitat loss due to wetland degradation or destruction. In Zimbabwe and southern Mozambique, an extensive recession of the species' inland range has taken place due to changes to river morphologies resulting from dam constructions. Key wetland sites in southern Africa, such as Walvis Bay in Namibia, have been subject to degradation because of the reclamation of wetlands for the development of suburbs, ports and roads. In Ghana, coastal erosion as well as proposed development involving drainage and land reclamation constitute a big threat for wetlands used as breeding habitat.

Major causes of nest loss in some regions are flooding due to spring tides and disturbance from tourists or off-road vehicles that drive through the breeding sites.
