= Guadalupe-Nipomo Dunes National Wildlife Refuge =

One of the largest coastal dune systems in California

- IUCN category IV (habitat/species management area)
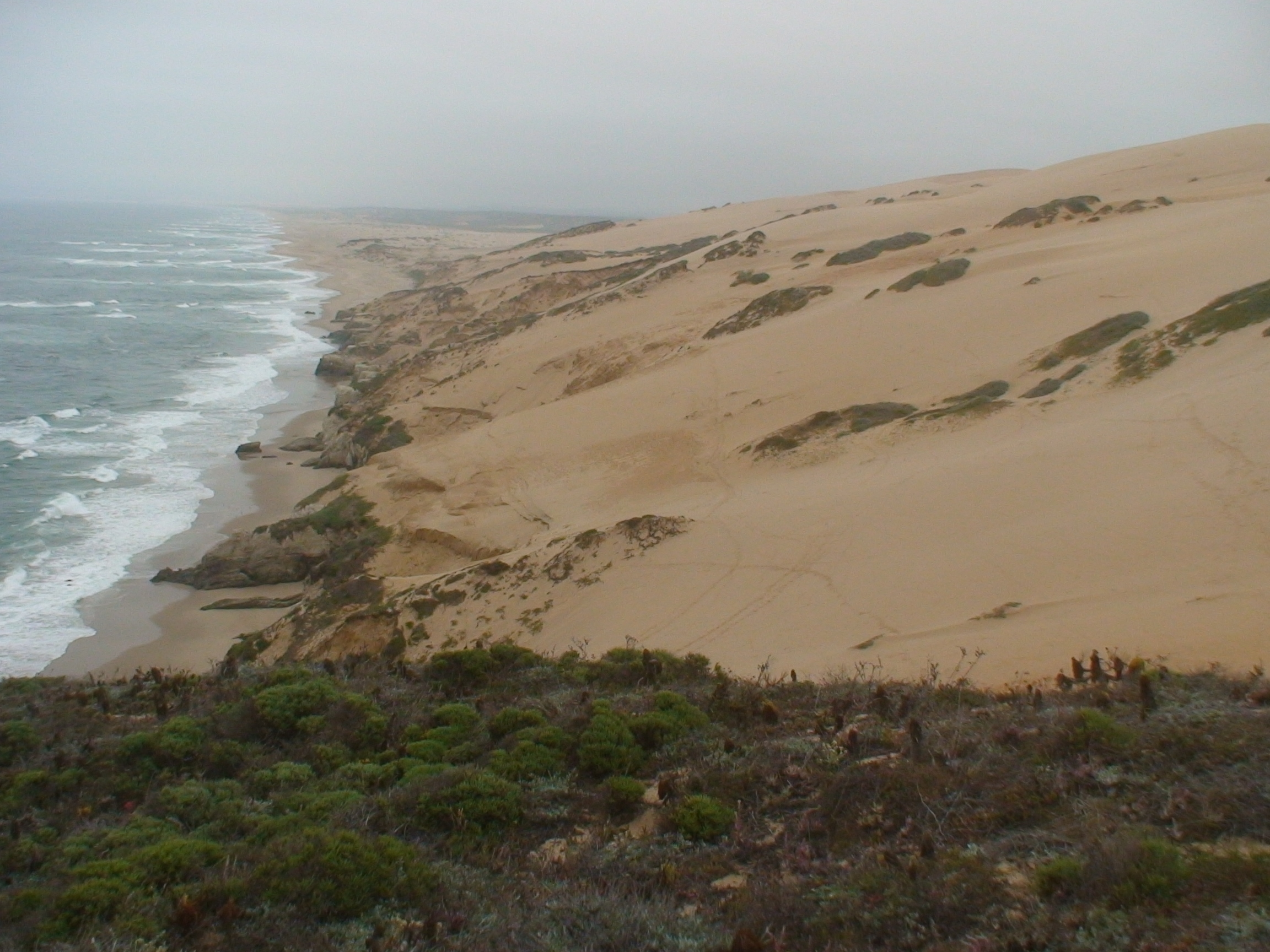
- Guadalupe-Nipomo Dunes.

- Location within the United States
- Location: San Luis Obispo County, Santa Barbara County, California, United States
- Nearest city: Guadalupe, California
- Coordinates: 35.0035°N 120.6143°W
- Area: 2,553 acres (10.33 km^{2})
- Established: 2000
- Governing body: U.S. Fish and Wildlife Service
- Website: Guadalupe-Nipomo Dunes National Wildlife Refuge

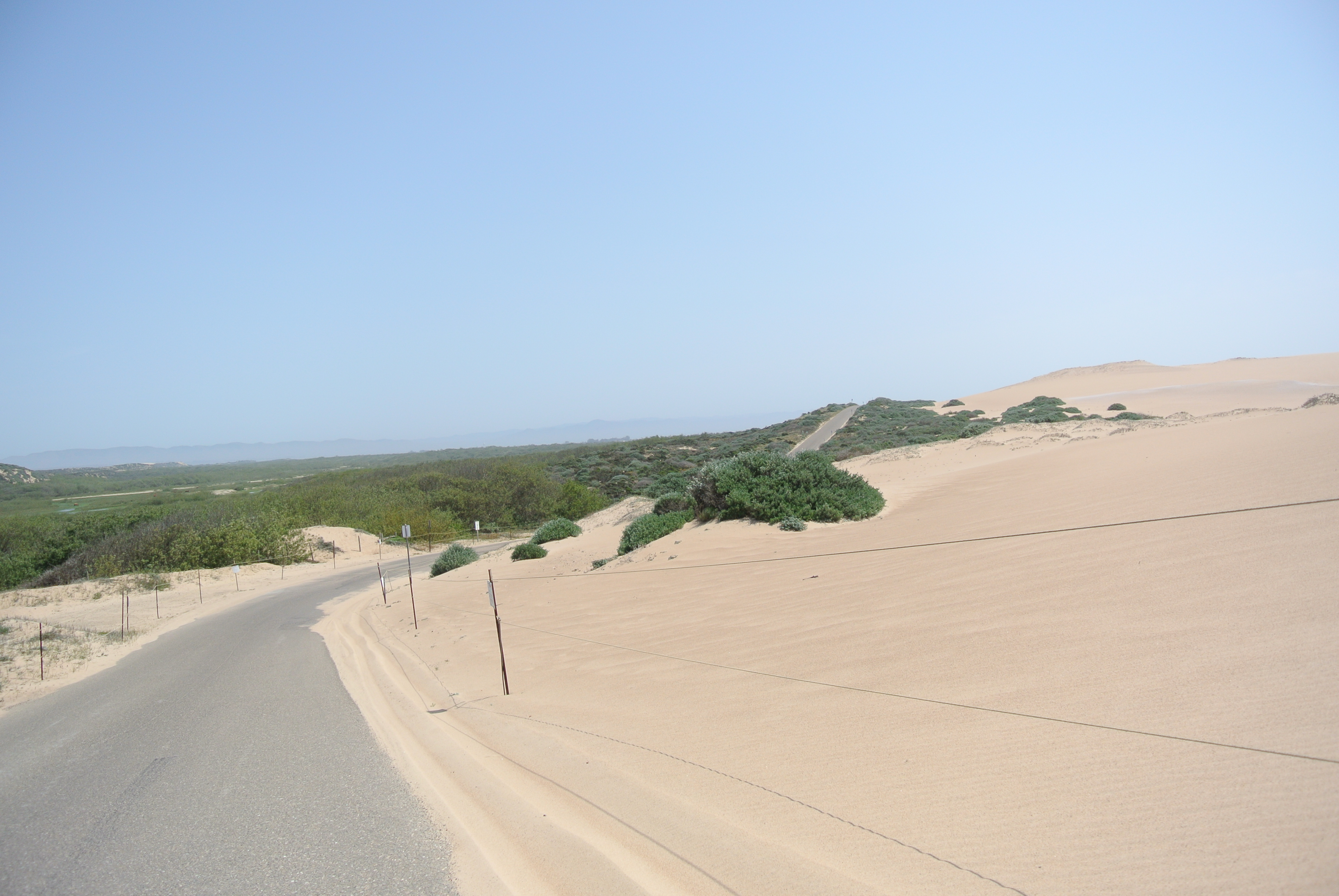
Transition zone (back dunes) in Guadalupe

The Guadalupe-Nipomo Dunes National Wildlife Refuge is a 2,553-acre (10.33 km^{2}) protected area located along the Central Coast of California, in southern San Luis Obispo and northern Santa Barbara Counties.

== Geography ==
Bordered by the Pacific Ocean to the west and farmland to the east, the refuge encompasses one of the largest coastal dune systems remaining in California.

The refuge is situated in the heart of the Guadalupe-Nipomo Dunes which is protected through a partnership program among Federal, State, and private landowners for the cooperative management of coastal resources. This cooperative effort enables all partners to share limited resources to meet common goals, such as endangered species management and the removal of invasive species that threaten this fragile habitat.

Access

Public access is provided by neighboring State and County park properties. The refuge offers a unique wilderness experience not found in the other parts of the Guadalupe-Nipomo Dunes.

== Conservation ==
The wildlife refuge was established to protect the breeding habitat for the endangered California least tern and the threatened Western snowy plover. The refuge also provides Coastal sage scrub habitat for other endangered species, including the California tiger salamander (recently listed for protection under the Endangered Species Act), California red-legged frog, Morro blue butterfly, IUCN Critically Endangered Morro shoulderband dune snail (Helminthoglypta walkeriana), and also 16 rare or endangered plant species.

Other recovering endangered species that use the refuge include large flocks of brown pelicans and a pair of peregrine falcons. The refuge contains healthy populations of mule deer, bobcat, and mountain lion, as well as large flocks of wintering shore birds and waterfowl.

== See also ==
- California chaparral and woodlands ecoregion
- California coastal sage and chaparral sub-ecoregion
- Coastal sage scrub – plant community
