= Guadalupe-Nipomo Dunes =

Dune system in California

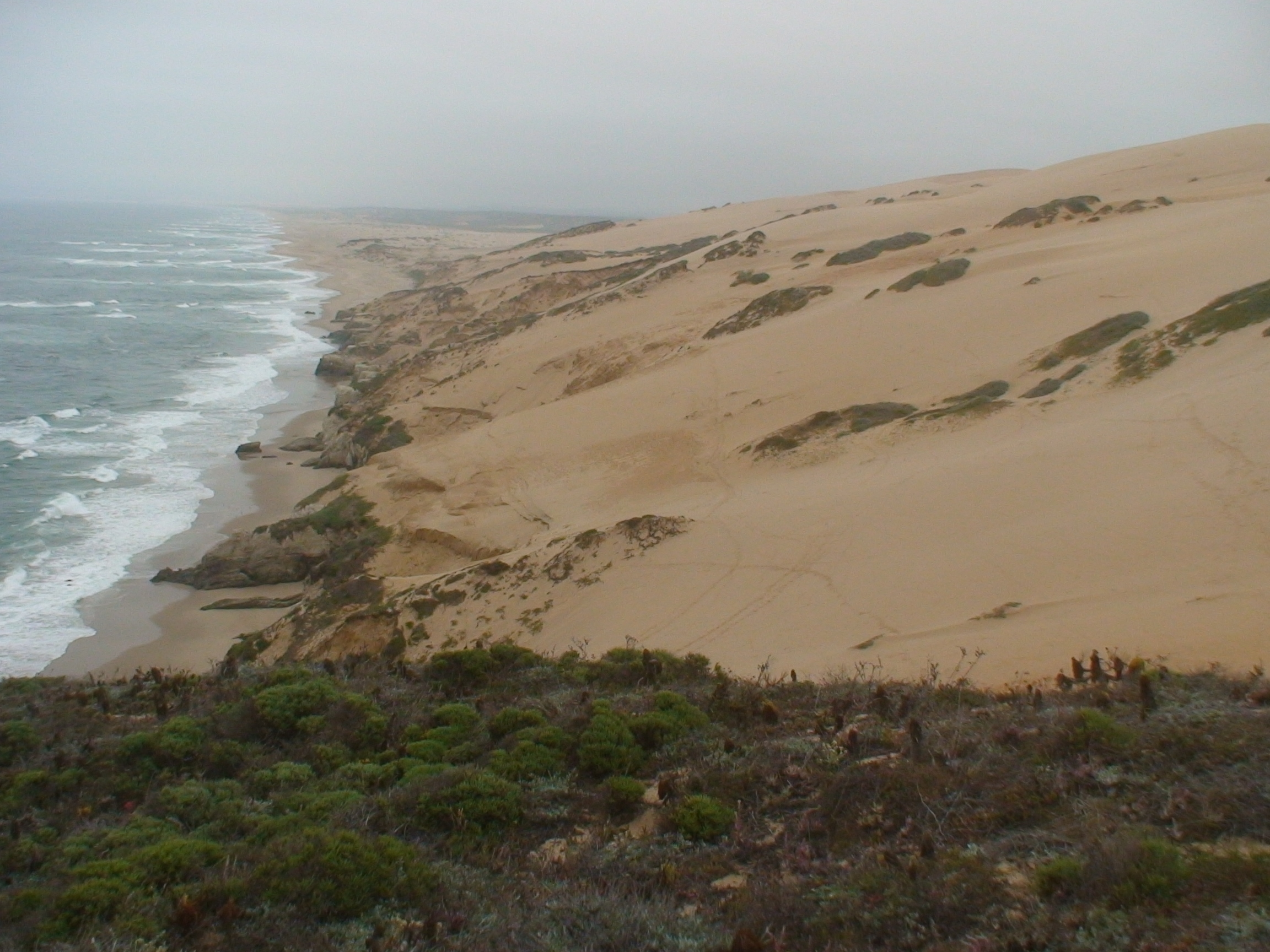
- A view of the Guadalupe-Nipomo Dune complex from its southern tip at Mussel Rock

- Location within California Location within the United States
- Location: San Luis Obispo County, Santa Barbara County, United States
- Nearest city: Oceano and Guadalupe, California
- Coordinates: 34.976°N 120.65°W
- Area: 22,000 acres (89 km^{2})
- Governing body: Federal, state, local & private

U.S. National Natural Landmark
- Designated: 1974

Guadalupe-Nipomo Dunes is the largest remaining dune system south of San Francisco and the second largest in the U.S. state of California. It encompasses an 18-mile (29 km) stretch of coastline on the Central Coast of California and extends from southern San Luis Obispo County to northern Santa Barbara County.

The Guadalupe-Nipomo Dunes Complex is home to a unique dunes ecosystem as well as many endangered and threatened species of plants and animals. To protect the dunes environment, much of the Complex has been set aside for conservation. In addition, it is recognized as a National Natural Landmark.

Another portion of the Dunes is utilized for recreation, such as camping and off-highway vehicle (OHV) use. The Guadalupe-Nipomo Dunes is owned by a number of federal, state, and local agencies, and private companies, organizations and individuals. These include the counties of San Luis Obispo and Santa Barbara, California State Parks, U.S. Fish and Wildlife Service and the Land Conservancy of San Luis Obispo County.

== History ==
The first known inhabitants of the Guadalupe-Nipomo Dunes were Native Americans of the Chumash tribe; early Spanish maritime explorers noted their settlements. However, Europeans did not travel through the Dunes themselves until September 2–4, 1769, when members of Don Gaspar de Portolà's overland expedition stayed in the Dunes and shot a skinny bear by the shores of what is now called Oso Flaco Lake. After eating the bear, two of the explorers became sick. The Chumash had poisoned the skinny bear - as a means of protection, they often incapacitated dangerous wildlife by feeding them tainted meat. This incident resulted in the lake's name: Oso Flaco or "Skinny Bear".

=== Film ===
In 1923, the epic movie The Ten Commandments directed by Cecil B. DeMille, was filmed on the Dunes. At the end of production, the massive sets reproducing ancient Egypt were dismantled and buried on the site to prevent reuse. The location was later used to film the episode "White Tip's Journey" (set in Late Cretaceous Mongolia) of the dinosaur documentary miniseries Dinosaur Planet in 2004. As of 2013 they remain buried there, despite decades of various proposals for excavation. Some artifacts have been recovered and are on display at The Dunes Visitor Center, while others may be seen from time to time as the dunes shift. Portions of Beyoncé's Black Is King were filmed on the Dunes in 2019.

=== Dunites and oil ===
From the 1920s until the 1940s, a group of mystics, nudists, artists, writers, and hermits known as the "Dunites" inhabited the Dunes. They regarded the Dunes as a center of creative energy. Gavin Arthur founded this art and literature commune and a magazine called "The Dune Forum". At the same time, oil companies had started buying up Dune land, and in 1948 oil was discovered in the Dunes. The oil company Unocal began operating the Guadalupe Oil Field in the 1950s. Over the course of the next forty years, Unocal leaked 18 million gallons of petroleum under the Dunes. In 1994, the company publicly recognized the spill and began cleaning up the 2,700-acre (11 km^{2}) site, which lies in San Luis Obispo County immediately north of the Santa Barbara County line. As of 2015, cleanup and restoration work was expected to continue for at least another 10 years.

=== Conservation ===
Starting in the 1970s, measures were taken to protect the natural environment at the Dunes. One of the biggest changes was the restriction of OHVs to the designated Oceano Dunes State Vehicular Recreation Area. This allowed for the other areas of the Dunes to undergo restoration efforts by conservation groups. As of 2013 the process of dune restoration continues.

== Geography and environment ==
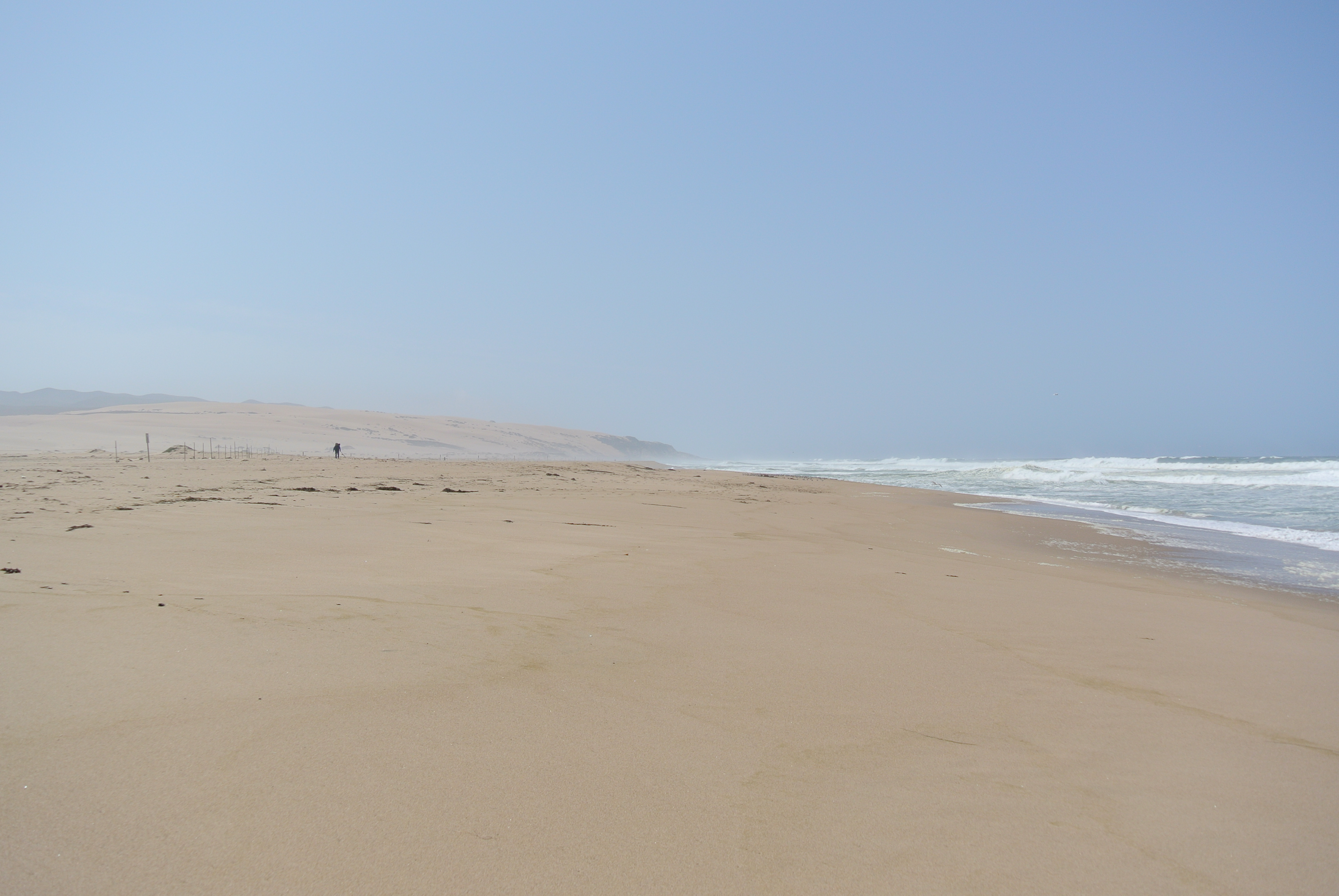
Beach at the Guadalupe Dunes County Park

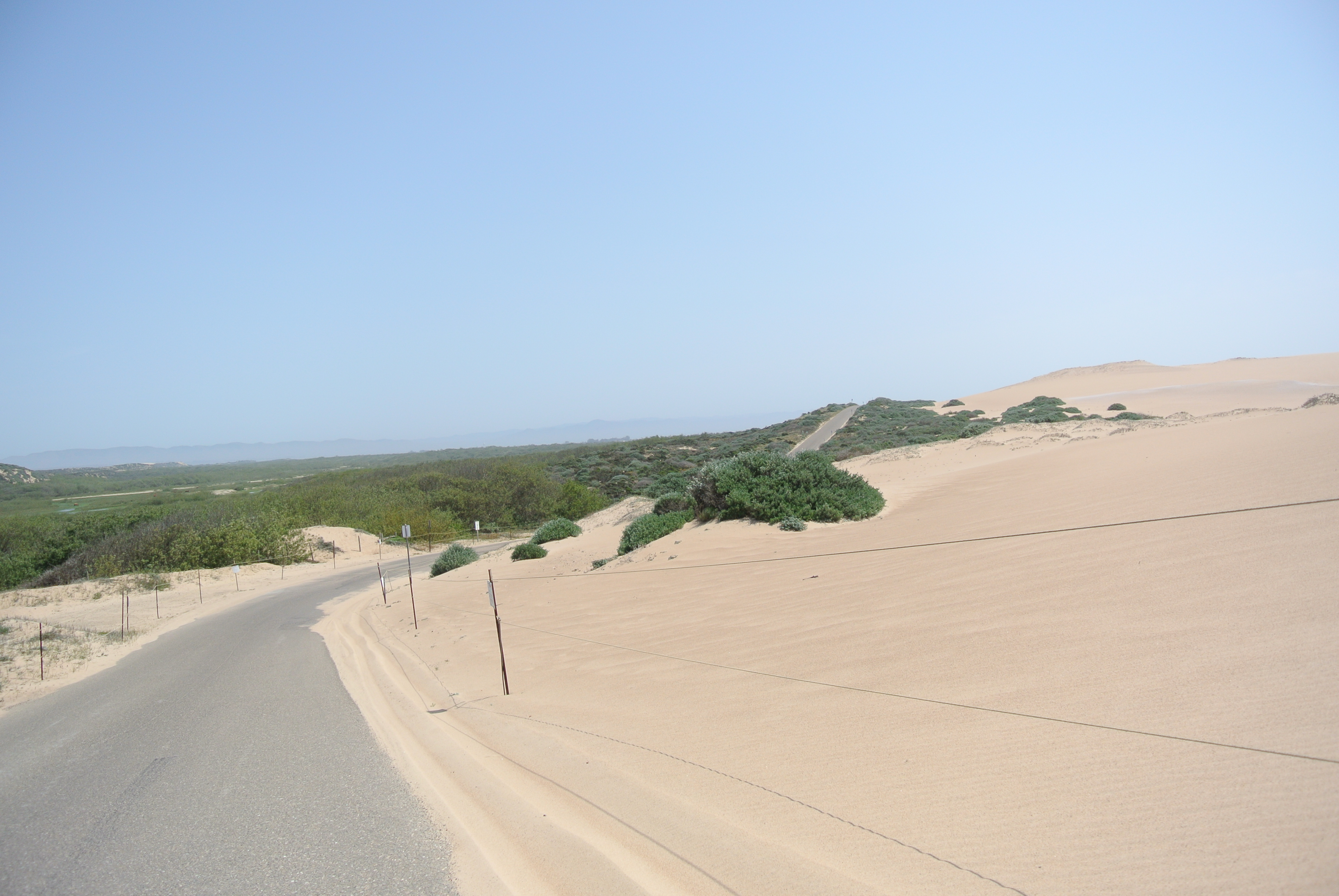
West Main Street and transition zone (back dunes), Guadalupe Dunes County Park

The Guadalupe-Nipomo Dunes were formed by a combination of factors including beach sand which was blown inland by the wind and the Santa Maria River which brought sediment to the coast. Dune-building began 18,000 years ago with the Nipomo and Orcutt Mesas. This Dune System has the highest dunes on the entire western coastline of the United States. Among these, Mussel Rock Dune is the highest, measuring approximately 500 feet (150 m). Another rare geographic treasure is Oso Flaco Lake, a freshwater lake located amid the Dunes.

Even though the Guadalupe-Nipomo Dunes consist of moving sand with extremely low moisture that is seemingly deprived of nutrients, it is home to a variety of flora and fauna. There are at least 18 endangered species of plants living in the Dunes. Dune plants must also be able to endure burial by sand, salt spray, high winds, and high insolation. The Nipomo Mesa lupine is endemic to the dunes and is limited to the area. There are five to seven colonies growing in a strip of sand dunes.

The dunes are separated into uplands and wetlands habitats. Uplands include the fore dunes, back dunes, and sandy beaches. Dunes can occur in three different formations. Primary Foredunes are parallel to the shore and support sparse vegetation. Parabolic dunes are U-shaped and perpendicular to the shore with vegetative ridges. Moving sand sheets consist of constantly moving sand, making it hard for vegetation to settle. The fore dunes begin at the high tide line, where only low growing plants with deep root systems (such as sand verbena) can live. The strong winds, salt spray, and massive amounts of sand make this area uninhabitable for other types of plants. Plants in the dunes adapt growth forms to survive high winds. Some grow close to the ground to avoid the wind and others adopt a Krummholz growth form. The back dunes, just behind the fore dunes, are stabilized and covered with plants. The back dunes are dominated by shrub species like mock heather, dune lupine, coastal buckwheat, and blochman's senecio. The sandy beaches are a harsh environment with no plants able to survive there. The wetlands include the areas that contain water: salt marshes, fresh and brackish-water marshes, swamps, and mudflats. Plants that live there are adapted to dynamic environmental conditions including high salinity concentration and extreme temperatures. Solutions that the plants can take to adapt to high salinity are large tap roots to reach the perched water table, thick cuticle to prevent water loss, and succulence.

Weeds have been introduced into the Dunes environment both purposefully and accidentally and threaten the native plant life. Various native plants are being choked out by invasive species like European beach grass. European beach grass achieves higher cover than native dune grass and is stimulated to grow by sand burial, causing a positive feedback.

Many species of animals can be found among the dunes. Over 200 species of birds live there, such as the western snowy plover, American peregrine falcon, California brown pelican, and California least tern. Other animals also depend on the dunes such as the California red-legged frog, western terrestrial garter snake, mule deer, black bear, bobcats, and mountain lions. Beetles, butterflies, lizards, saltwater and freshwater fish inhabit the dunes as well.

=== Dust and air quality ===
The dunes have been involved with an ongoing series of environmental debates regarding the reduced air quality found in the receiving towns downwind of the dune system. Physical effects by the dust aerosols are indicated by accounts of homeowners claiming discomfort in breathing during times of high dust concentration, and air quality measurements. The San Luis Obispo County Air Pollution Control District has been researching the reduced air quality downwind of the Oceano Dunes SVRA since 1995, and has concluded that while there is a natural component to the dust pollution, off-highway vehicular activity makes it worse.

=== Western snowy plover ===
Off-road vehicle use partially conflicts with habitat of the western snowy plover (Charadrius nivosus) which was listed as threatened under the Endangered Species Act (ESA) on March 5, 1993. It is alleged that use by vehicles directly correlates with a decrease in reproductive success. However, western snowy plover nests have increased dramatically from 16 nests in 1993 to a total of 172 nests in 2011. Memorial Day weekend is one of the park's busiest, and occurs during the plover nesting season. Yet, year after year, large numbers of plover nests are found at nesting sites closest to the open vehicle area at Oceano Dunes, suggesting human presence may deter presence of predators, and that plover may receive refuge at these sites. An eight-year summary of western snowy plover reproduction on California State Park lands depicts the breeding success at Oceano Dunes which is particularly stark compared to very low breeding numbers elsewhere in the state.

Ecologists argue that the snowy plover does not just breed on any coastal area; they seek protection in the dunes. Scientist Tom Jordan studied data on bird nesting sites and found that snowy plovers "prefer the beach and the flatter areas," such as on top of the dunes, where they can watch for predators. Plovers prefer nesting on open sand which can put nests at risk of being crushed by vehicles or hikers.

The Santa Lucia Chapter of the Sierra Club proposed year-round fencing to protect plover habitat, but the Oceano Dunes State Vehicular Recreation Area rejected the idea. Soon after the decision, a plover was killed by an off-road vehicle in a recommended area for fencing. The Sierra Club sued the State Parks for violating the ESA by not providing enough protection for the snowy plover, as well as the California least tern and steelhead trout.

In the case settlement, the State Park was given the responsibility of researching, fund raising, and establishing an education program about the snowy plover. The Park must close off an additional half-mile of the beach between March and October, the plover's breeding season. Additionally, they must find alternate routes to avoid vehicles crossing the Arroyo Grande Creek because it is inhabited by the steelhead trout.

Year	Nests found
1993	16
1994	31
1995	31
1996	32
1997	30
1998	42
1999	13
2000	15
2001	33
2002	35
2003	95
2004	147
2005	107
2006	117
2007	99
2008	121
2009	150
2010	155
2011	172

== Management, uses, and ownership ==
Within the Guadalupe-Nipomo Dunes Complex are several distinct regions, each managed by different organizations and used for various purposes.

- Pismo State Beach
  - North Beach Campgrounds is located at the northernmost part of the Dunes and is run by the California Department of Parks and Recreation.
  - Oceano Campgrounds is located further south than the North Beach Campgrounds, near the town of Oceano. The Oceano Campgrounds, like the North Beach Campgrounds, is run by the California Department of Parks and Recreation and also has a nature museum on site.
- The Oso Flaco Lake Natural Area is part of the Oceano Dunes State Vehicular Recreation Area located north of the city of Guadalupe. Visitors to the Natural Area can walk along the mile-long boardwalk that follows the creek, passing across Oso Flaco Lake, to the ocean.
  - The California Office of Environmental Health Hazard Assessment has issued a safe eating advisory for any fish caught in Oso Flaco Lake due to elevated levels of DDTs, dieldrin, or mercury.
- The Dunes Center is an agency developed to promote the conservation of the Dunes ecosystem through education, research and cooperative stewardship. It receives funding from both private and public sources. The Dunes Center is located in the city of Guadalupe, in a restored 1910 craftsman bungalow. The Center features exhibits about the natural history of the dunes, and the area's cultural history.
- The 2,553 acres (1,033 ha) Guadalupe-Nipomo Dunes National Wildlife Refuge (NWR) is located in the midsection of the Dunes Complex and includes 1.8 miles (2.9 km) of beach front. The NWR was established in 2000 by the U.S. Fish and Wildlife Service and includes some of the most remote and least disturbed habitats in the dunes complex. It is home to more than 120 species of rare plants and animals, including La Graciosa thistle, surf thistle, beach spectacle pod, giant coreopsis, California red-legged frog, western snowy plover, and California least tern. Access is seasonal and requires a long hike. Dogs and pack animals are prohibited.
- Rancho Guadalupe Dunes County Park is located at the southern end of the dunes and is owned by the Santa Barbara County Parks and leased to the Center for Natural Lands Management. In comparison to other areas of the Dunes, Rancho Guadalupe Dunes County Park is the least damaged by introduced invasive plant species. For visitors, the Park offers bird and whale watching, fishing, hiking areas, picnic area (no BBQs/cooking permitted), interpretive kiosk and trailer. Seasonal restrictions during the nesting bird season (Mar 1 - Oct 1) apply and are posted on site.
- Oceano Dunes State Vehicular Recreation Area (SVRA) is located south of Oceano. It consists of five and half miles of beach open for vehicle use and a large area of the sand dunes open for off-highway vehicle (OHV) use, including quads, dirt-bikes, and four-wheel drive vehicles. It is the most popular off-road park in the state because it is the only state park in California where people can legally drive on the beach. Each year the park attracts 2 million visitors. The park also offers guests the ability to camp on the beach itself. Other activities available at the park include horseback riding and bird watching. The Oceano Dunes camping and recreational facility has been a favored site for more than 100 years. Also, with two million visitors a year, the county calculates that revenue is generated from off-roading tourism. During the closure due to the 2019 COVID-19 outbreak, a study by a Cal Poly San Luis Obispo professor found that there was no significant impact on the county's economy. He analyzed tax and unemployment data collected from March through August 2020. However, in contrast, a 2017 study commissioned by State Parks found that revenue generated by the OHV visitors resulted in $243 million for the county,... a survey in which participants said that they would not visit if the vehicular recreation area did not exist. The professor wrote in his study concerning the possibility of less visitors, "While this may be the case for the OHV visitors, it is certainly not the case for the pedestrian and equestrian visitors."

The Oceano State Vehicular Recreation Area has taken measures to protect wildlife by fencing off specific areas from pedestrians and vehicles and creating rules for visitors. Some rules are: adhere to the 15 mph (24 km/h) speed limit, do not enter closed areas, keep dogs on a leash at all times, and rid the beach of trash that could attract predators. During the busy holidays, extra rangers are brought into the park to ensure rules are enforced.

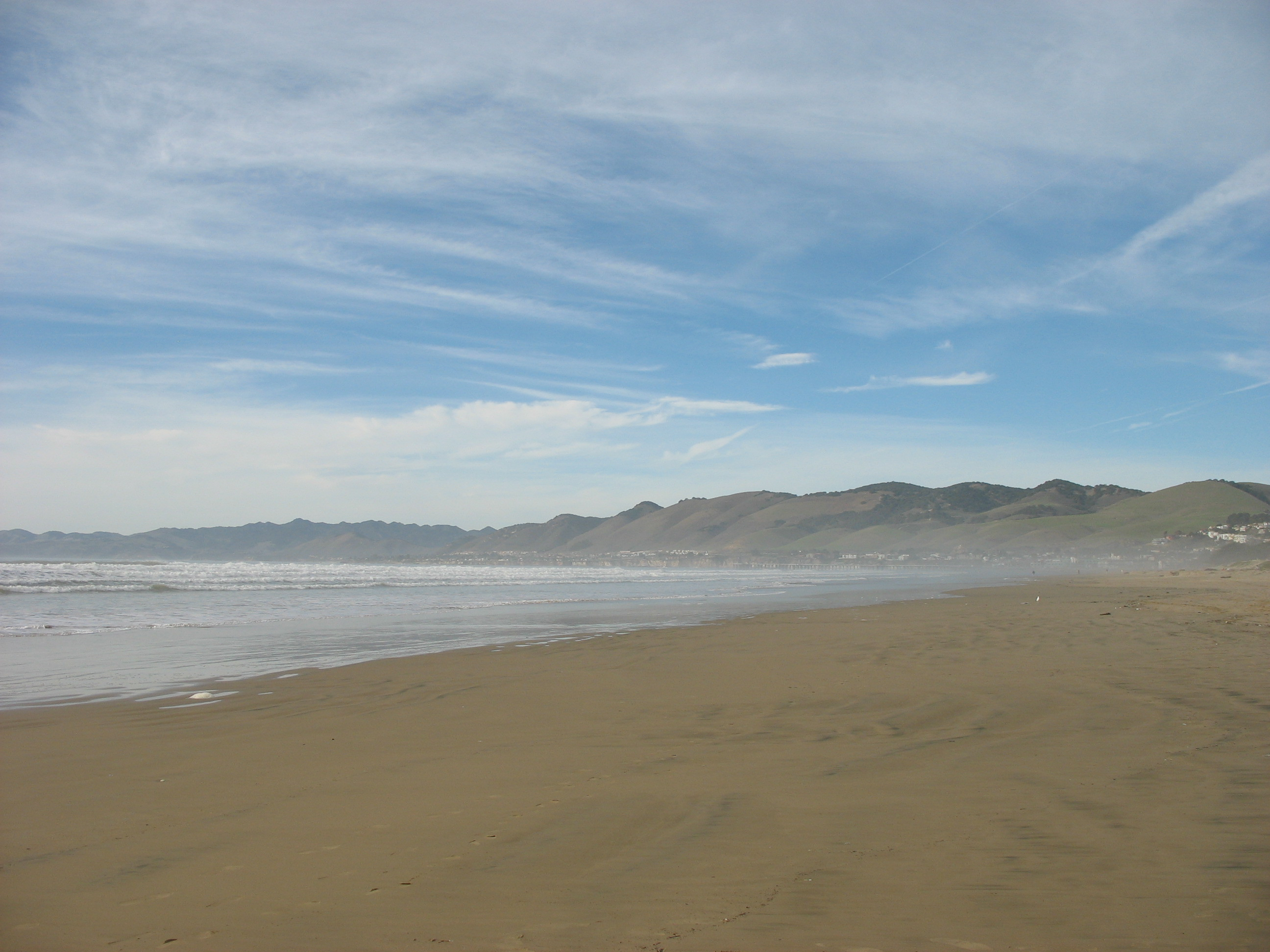
View of Pismo Beach from Oceano State Vehicular Recreation Area

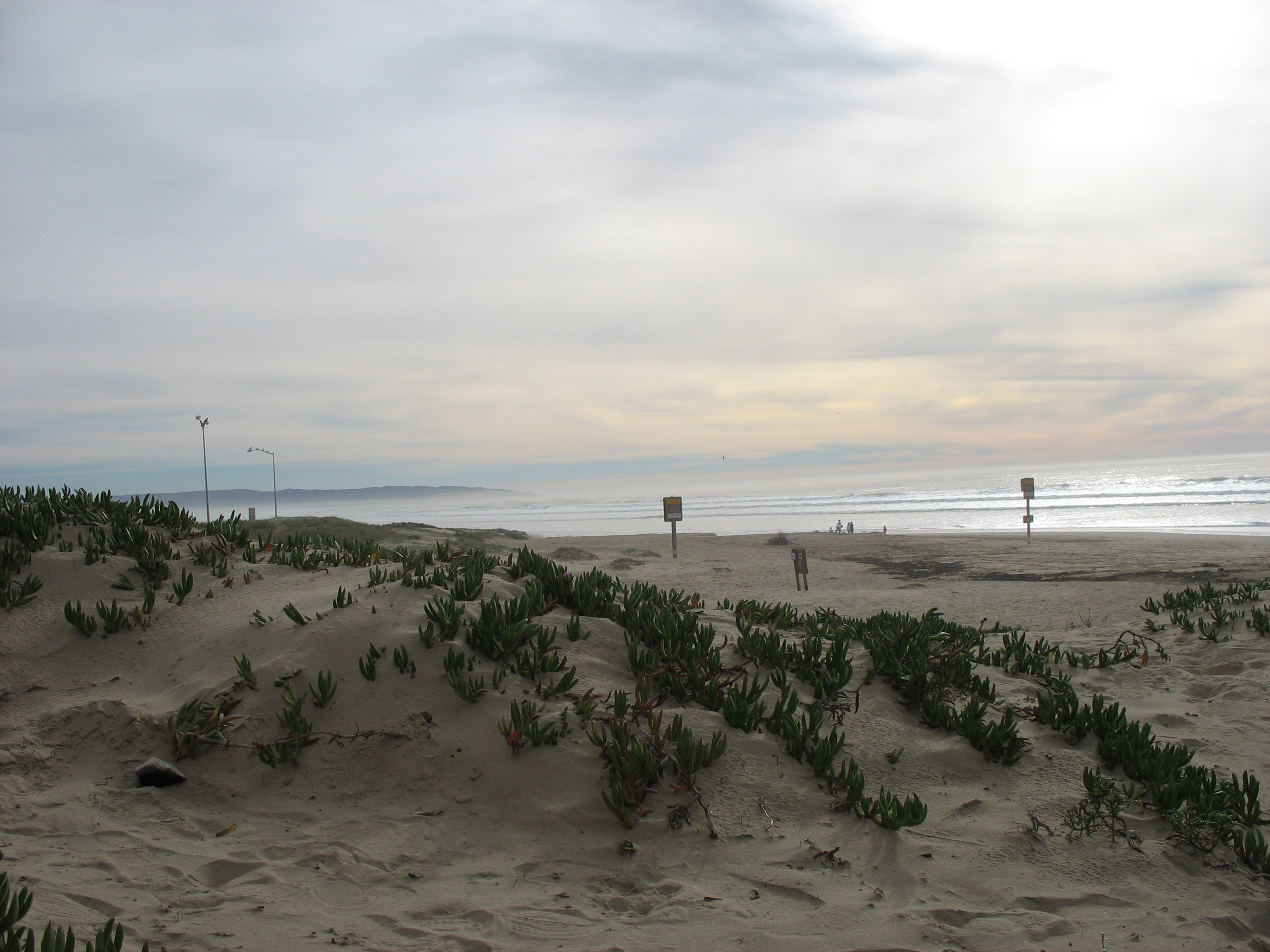
Oceano Beach, California

=== Ownership ===
For 25 years, the County of San Luis Obispo has leased 584 acres (2.36 km^{2}) of the Dunes to the State Department of Parks and Recreation, free of charge. When the lease expired in June 2008, the San Luis Obispo County Board of Supervisors had options, including sale of the land, renewal of the deal with the state or creation of a deal requiring the state to pay rent. To determine whether or not to sell the dune property to the state, two public hearings were held April 17, 2007. To sell real property, four-fifths of the supervisors must vote in favor; but in order to renew a lease only a majority is required.

The State Parks offered to pay $4.86 million for nearly 584 acres (2.36 km^{2}) of beachfront property that is directly in the middle of the Oceano Dunes State Vehicular Recreation area. Various groups and individuals would like to see the land sold to the State Parks. Currently, the Oceano Dunes State Vehicular Recreation Area uses one third of the beach territory for off-road vehicles use. Off-roaders are concerned that since the decision is in the hands of the county, San Luis Obispo County's environmental community may advise more restrictions on the land if it isn't sold. Land available for vehicle use has already been reduced from 15,000 acres (61 km^{2}) to 1,500 acres (6.1 km^{2}). The State wants to buy the land in order to secure a place for off-road vehicles for the future. They claim not all the land would be used for off-road vehicles and camping, and that part of the land would be set aside as preserve areas, as the County wants. On Tuesday April 17, 2007, the San Luis Obispo Board of Supervisors voted 4–0 not to sell the 584 acres (2.36 km^{2}) of land to the State.

== See also ==
- California chaparral and woodlands ecoregion
- California coastal sage and chaparral (sub-ecoregion)
- Dunites
