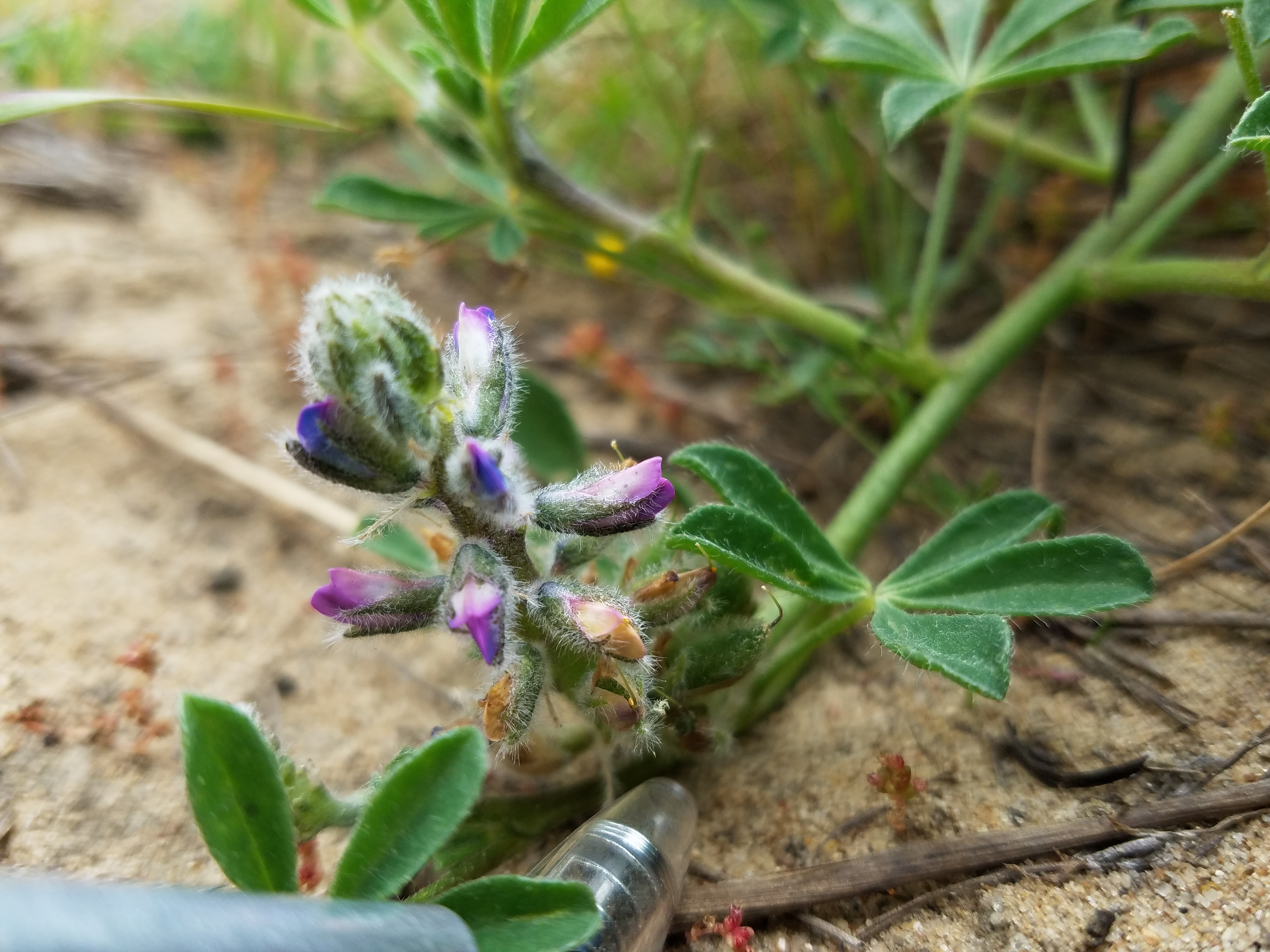

Conservation status
- Endangered (ESA)

Scientific classification
- Kingdom: Plantae
- Clade: Tracheophytes
- Clade: Angiosperms
- Clade: Eudicots
- Clade: Rosids
- Order: Fabales
- Family: Fabaceae
- Subfamily: Faboideae
- Genus: Lupinus
- Species: L. nipomensis

Binomial name
- Lupinus nipomensis Eastw.

= Lupinus nipomensis =

Species of plant endemic to California

Lupinus nipomensis is a species of lupine known by the common name Nipomo Mesa lupine. It is endemic to the Guadalupe-Nipomo Dunes on the California Central Coast. Specifically, the plant is limited to the Guadalupe Dunes at the southern border of San Luis Obispo County. There are five to seven colonies growing in a strip of sand dunes measuring less than 3 square miles (8 km^{2}) in area. These colonies are generally considered to make up a single population. The number of individual plants remaining has been observed to vary between 100 and 1,800, its abundance is not correlated to precipitation, is highly variable and exact mechanisms driving abundance unknown. This is a California state and federally listed endangered species.

Nipomo Mesa lupine is a small, spreading annual herb with a stem reaching 10 to 50 centimeters (4 to 20 in) in length. Each palmate leaf is made up of 5 to 7 narrow, succulent leaflets 1–1.5 cm (0.4–0.6 in) long and just a few millimeters wide. The herbage is hairy in texture, but can sometimes be glabrous and new stems emerge in equidistant sets of threes. When first emerging the seedlings have a reddish/purple hue from anthocyanin to help reduce ultraviolet damage. The inflorescence is a small, crowded raceme of flowers each 6 to 7 millimeters long. The flower is pink with a lighter, sometimes yellowish spot on its banner. The fruit is a legume pod up to 2 cm (0.8 in) long. No traditional pollinators have been found to be associated with this plant - however, it does host a diverse suite of other arthropod interactions. Notably, they are visited by Trigonoscuta (Sand weevil) species which are potentially rare and endemic to sand dunes. It was found that they are negatively impacted by, a gall maggot from the family Anthomyiidae, Delia lupini. D. lupini creates galls on the plant and when vacated, have been observed to host other pests such as Scaphomorphus beetles.

== Conservation ==
This plant is restricted to a small system of sand dunes all located on privately owned land. The biggest threats to its existence include invasive species of plants, particularly perennial veldtgrass (Ehrharta calycina), and herbivory by Botta's pocket gopher (Thomomys bottae). They also face increased decrease in habitat due to land use change causing habitat conversion or habitat fragmentation. Recent studies have found that they have specific microhabitat preferences, overlooked in the past, that could be utilized to improve conservation efforts. More specifically, the species often preferred less exposed microhabitats such as dune swales and north facing slopes. Scientists and stakeholders are drafting plans to save the lupine from extinction.
