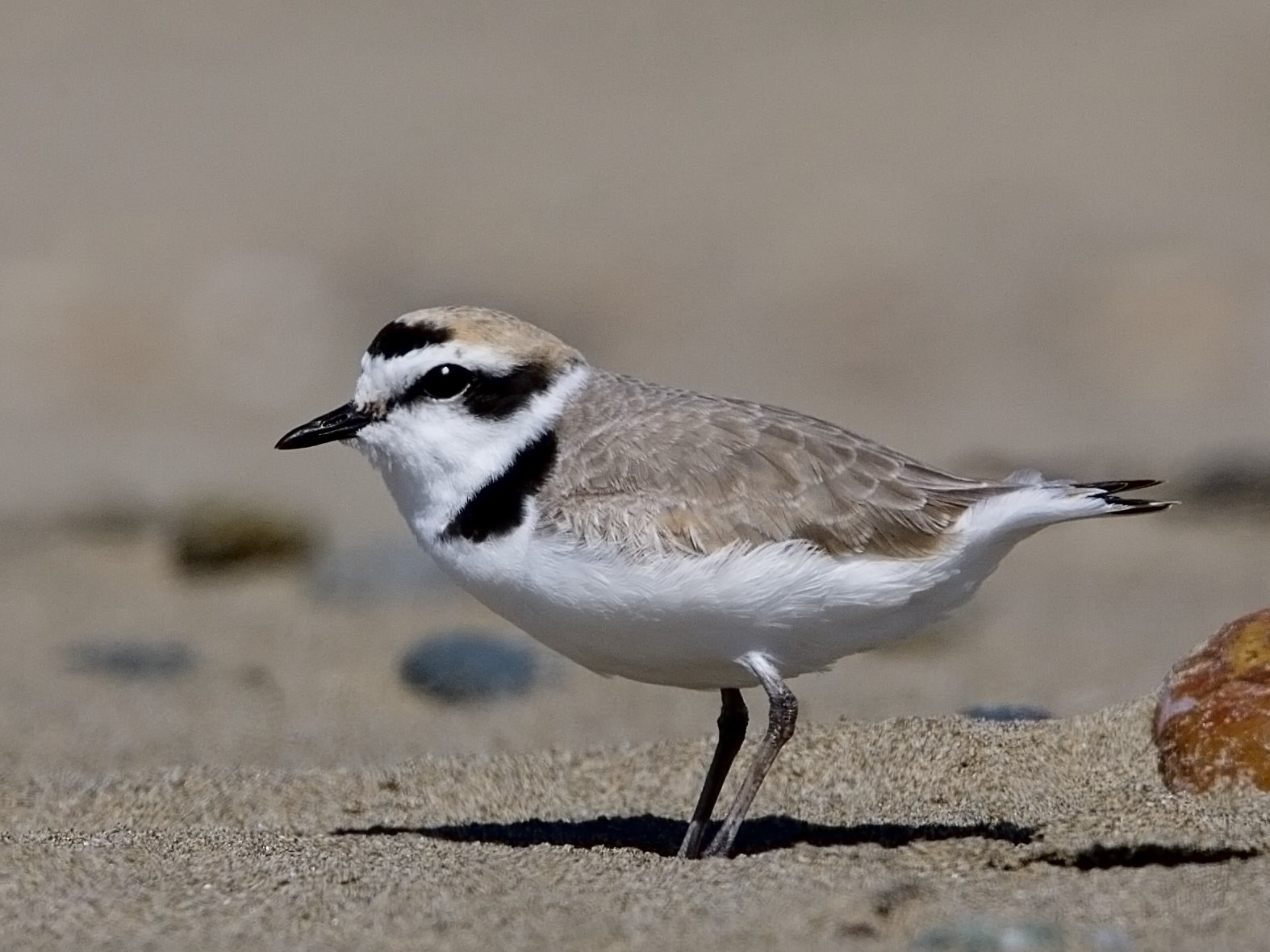
- Male in breeding plumage on Morro Strand State Beach, California

Conservation status
- Near Threatened (IUCN 3.1)

Scientific classification
- Kingdom: Animalia
- Phylum: Chordata
- Class: Aves
- Order: Charadriiformes
- Family: Charadriidae
- Genus: Anarhynchus
- Species: A. nivosus

Binomial name
- Anarhynchus nivosus (Cassin, 1858)
- Breeding range Resident range Non-breeding range

= Snowy plover =

Species of bird

The snowy plover (Anarhynchus nivosus, formerly Charadrius nivosus) is a small shorebird found in the Americas. It is a member of the bird family Charadriidae, which includes the plovers, dotterels, and lapwings. The snowy plover was originally described by John Cassin in 1858, but was classified as a subspecies of the Kentish plover in 1922. Since 2011, the snowy plover has been recognized as a distinct species based on genetic and anatomical differences from the Kentish plover. Two or three subspecies are recognized, distributed along the Pacific coast of North America, Ecuador, Peru, and Chile, in several inland areas of the US and Mexico, along the Gulf Coast, and on Caribbean islands. The coastal populations consist of both residential and migratory birds, whereas the inland populations are mostly migratory. It is one of the best studied endemic shorebirds of the Americas, and one of the rarest.

Snowy plovers are pale brown above and white below, with a white band on the hind neck. During the breeding season, males have black patches behind the eye and on the side of the neck; the neck patches are separated from each other and do not form a continuous breast band as in many other plovers. Snowy plovers can also be distinguished from other plovers in having an all-black and slender bill, and gray to black legs. The typical call is a repeated "tu-wheet".

This plover inhabits open areas in which vegetation is absent or sparse, in particular coastal sand beaches and shores of salt or soda lakes, where it feeds on invertebrates such as crustaceans, worms, beetles, and flies. At the beginning of the breeding season, males excavate multiple nest scrapes that are advertised to females; one of these scrapes is later selected for breeding. Some females will desert their brood soon after the chicks hatch to re-mate with another male, while their first mate will continue to rear the chicks. Such polygamy is uncommon in birds, and is possibly a strategy to maximize breeding success. There are more males than females – 1.4 times as many in California – and the more pronounced this sex ratio imbalance is, the more females engage in polyandrous behavior.

The snowy plover is listed as near threatened by the International Union for Conservation of Nature. The main threats are habitat destruction due to invasive beach grasses, urban development, as well as frequent disturbance due to recreational uses of beaches. Conservation measures on the US Pacific coast include roping-off beach areas that are used for breeding, the removal of invasive beach grasses, and protection against egg predators. While such measures have been successful locally, the global population is thought to be in decline.

== Taxonomy and systematics ==
The snowy plover was first described by John Cassin in 1858 as Aegialitis nivosa, based on a skin collected in 1854 by William P. Trowbridge in Presidio, which later became part of San Francisco. This skin, the holotype of the species, was subsequently lost. Although originally part of the collection of the National Museum of Natural History, it was given to the collector Henry E. Dresser of England in 1872. In 1898, the Dresser collection was transferred to the Victoria University of Manchester, but the skin was apparently not part of this transfer. Joseph Grinnell, who attempted to locate the holotype in 1931, suggested that Dresser may have been unaware of the specimen's significance and may have given it elsewhere. The snowy plover is one of the best-studied endemic shorebirds of the Americas, although most of this research was carried out on western North American populations, with few monitoring programs targeting the South American and eastern North American populations.

Plovers (Charadriinae) are a subfamily of small shorebirds that breed in open habitats on all continents except Antarctica. Together with the lapwings (Vanellinae), they form the family Charadriidae. The snowy plover was traditionally considered to be a species within the genus Charadrius, which comprised 32 extant species and was therefore the most species-rich genus of the family. However, a 2013 genetic analysis found that the lapwings are nested within Charadrius; the latter is therefore polyphyletic (is not a natural group, i.e., the most distantly related Charadrius species are more closely related to lapwings than to each other). Some subsequent studies confirmed this and proposed to split Charadrius into five separate genera. The snowy plover, formerly Charadrius nivosus, was transferred into the genus Anarhynchus, as Anarhynchus nivosus, along with 22 other plover species; in 2023, this transfer was recognized by the International Ornithologists' Union. Before the transfer, Anarhynchus contained only one species, the wrybill from New Zealand. The name Anarhynchus derives from the Ancient Greek ἀνα- (ana-) meaning 'backward' and ῥυγχος (rhunkhos) meaning 'bill'. The species name nivosus is Latin for 'snowy'.

The snowy plover appears to be most closely related to the Kentish, the white fronted, the Malaysian, the chestnut-banded, and the red-capped plover, as shown in a cladogram from a 2015 study:

- - Red-capped plover
  - - Snowy plover
    - - Chestnut-banded plover
      - - Malaysian plover
        - - White-fronted plover
          - Kentish plover

The snowy plover is closely related, and visually similar, to the Kentish plover of Eurasia and Africa. Harry C. Oberholser, in 1922, argued that the differences in plumage between these species are not consistent, and no clear line of demarcation could be drawn. Consequently, he classified the two subspecies of the snowy plover that were recognized at that time (nivosus and tenuirostris) as subspecies of the Kentish plover. This assessment was subsequently followed by most authors, until a 2009 genetic study re-established the snowy plover as a separate species. This study noted that, besides differences in the mitochondrial and nuclear DNA, snowy plovers differ from Kentish plovers in being smaller, having shorter tarsi and wings, different chick plumages, and different advertisement calls of the males. In 2011, the International Ornithological Congress (IOC) and the American Ornithologists' Union (AOU) recognized them as separate species.

=== Subspecies ===
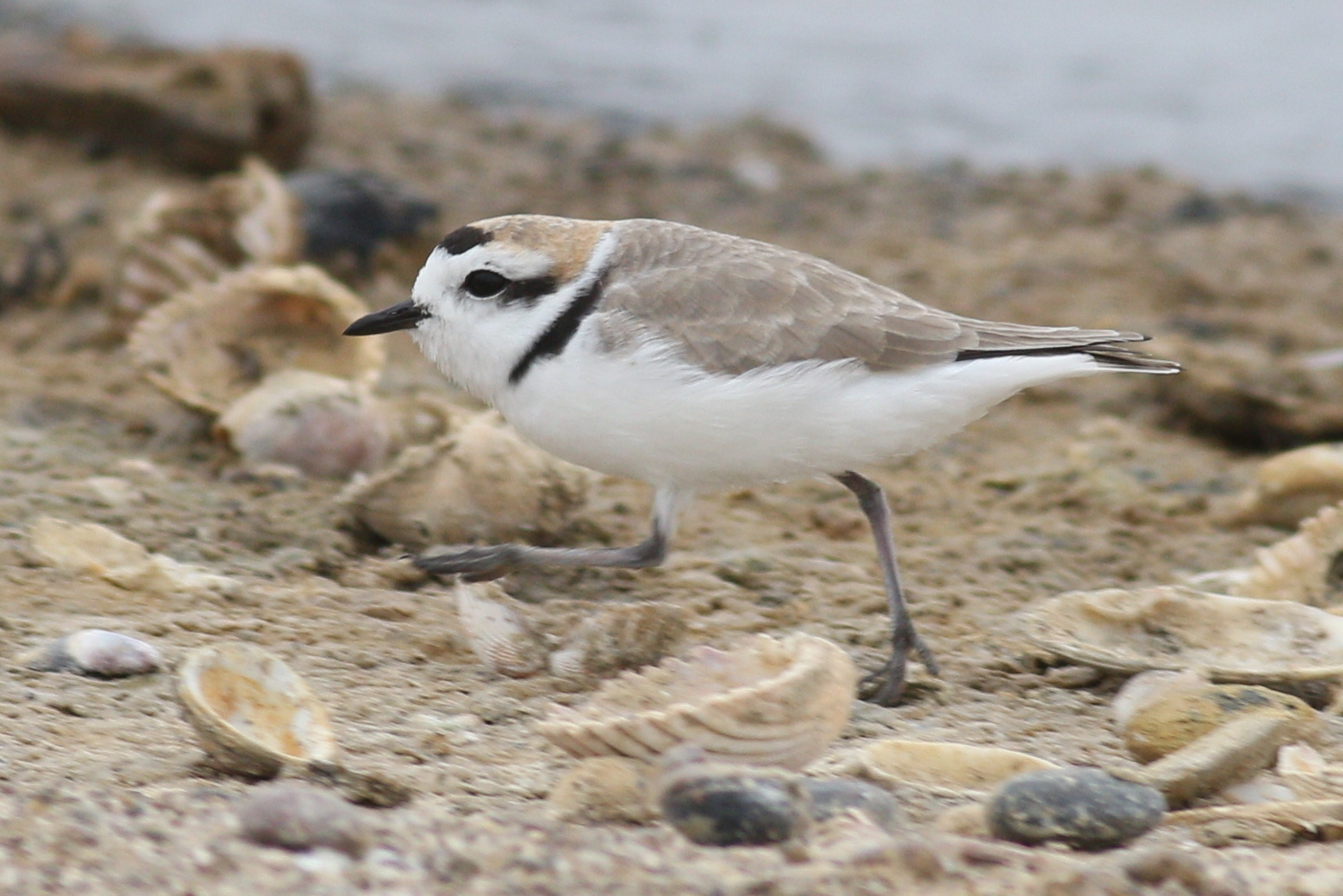
The subspecies A. n. occidentalis, walking between bivalve shells on a beach near Ica, Peru

Two to three subspecies are commonly recognized:

- Anarhynchus nivosus nivosus (Cassin, 1858): The nominate subspecies, found in North America west of Louisiana.
- Anarhynchus nivosus tenuirostris (Lawrence, 1862): The Cuban snowy plover, found in North America east of Louisiana. The distinction of this subspecies from the nivosus subspecies is contested, but two genetic analyses in 2007 and 2020 have supported its separation.
- Anarhynchus nivosus occidentalis (Cabanis, 1872): Found on the Pacific coast of South America. It is slightly larger than the nominate subspecies, the lore (the area between eye and beak) is white, and the black patch on the forehead is slightly broader.

A 2020 study suggested that the snowy plover populations can be subdivided into four distinct demes (groups of individuals more genetically similar to each other than to other individuals): The western nivosus deme in western North America, the eastern nivosus deme in Florida, the tenuirostris deme on the Caribbean islands and Bermuda, and the occidentalis deme in South America. The study found little genetic exchange between these demes, except for a strong migration from the western to the eastern nivosus deme (but not vice versa).

== Description ==
The snowy plover is a plump shorebird with a large head, a short and slender bill, and short neck and tail. It is a small plover, with adults ranging from 15 to 17 cm (5.9 to 6.7 in) in length, from 34 to 43.2 cm (13.4 to 17.0 in) in wingspan, and from 40 to 43 g (1.4 to 1.5 oz) in weight. Its body is typically held horizontally. Compared to other plovers, its legs are relatively long and its wings short. The bill is black, the iris dark brown, and the legs gray to black.

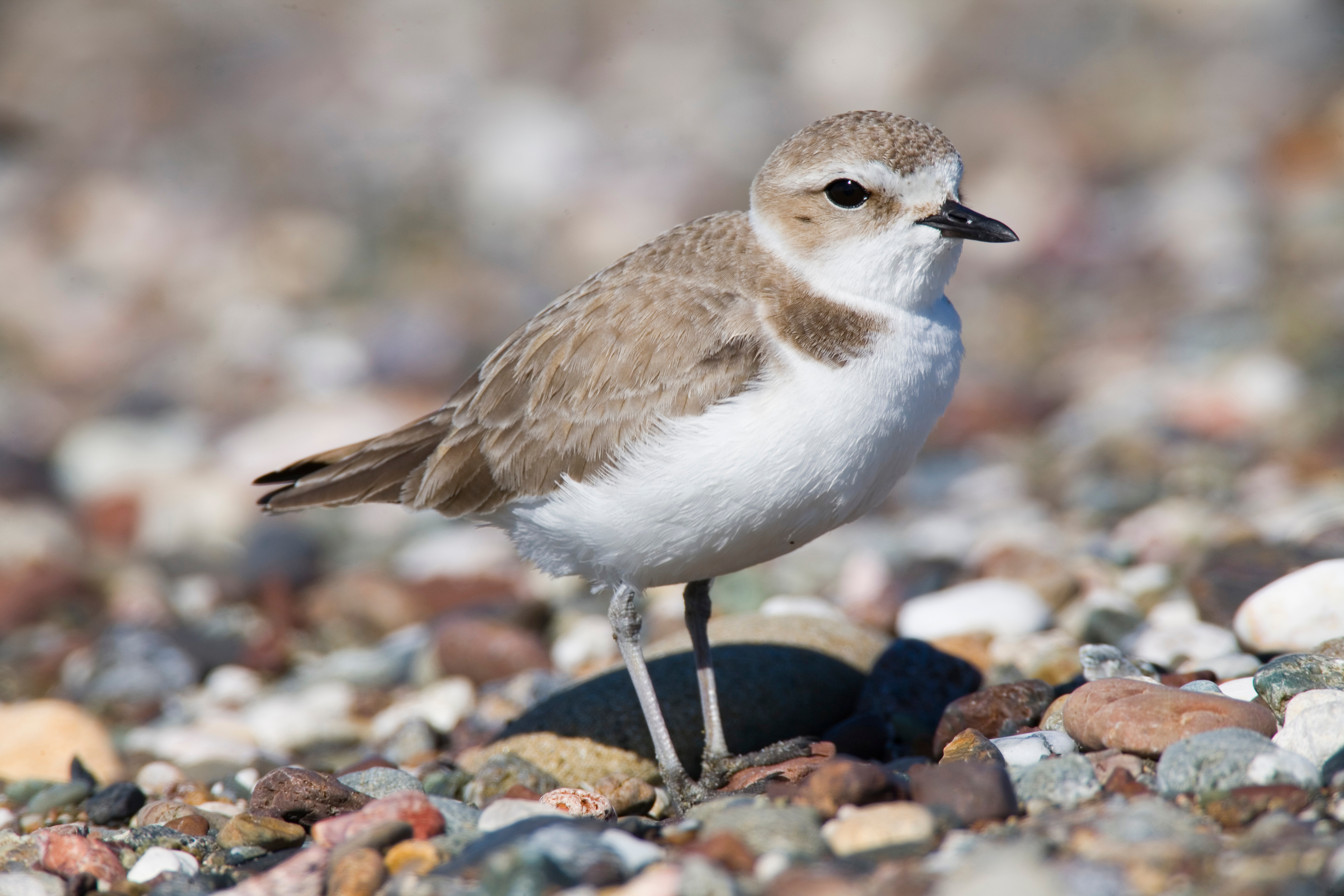
Snowy plover in non-breeding plumage near Cayucos, California

Snowy plovers are pale brown above and white below, with a white band on the hind neck and a smudgy eyestripe (absent in the South American subspecies). Breeding males have black patches behind the eye ("ear patch"), on the sides of the neck, and on the forehead. In males, the crown may be reddish at the start of the breeding season. The breeding female is slightly duller, and typically one or more of the patches are partly or completely brown. The neck patches on each side are well separated and rarely joined at the front, giving the appearance of a "broken" breast band in contrast to the continuous breast band in many other plovers. Outside the breeding season, the neck and ear patches are pale and the forehead patch is absent, and plumages of males and females cannot be distinguished. Newly hatched chicks have pale upper sides with brown to black spots and are white below.

Similar species within its range include the piping plover, the collared plover, the semipalmated plover, and Wilson's plover. Amongst other features, the snowy plover differs from these species in its slender and entirely black bill (shorter and thicker in piping plover and longer and thicker in Wilson's plover, and with orange base in piping and breeding semipalmated plover), in its gray to black legs (orange or yellow in piping, collared, and semipalmated plover), and the "broken" breast band (usually complete in semipalmated, Wilson's, and breeding collared plovers).

=== Vocalizations ===
The typical call is a repeated "tu-wheet" given in a wide range of contexts. In males, these include advertisement while standing in territories and courtship. In both sexes, the call may be given in situations of threat, aggression, distress, and alarm. This call differs between sexes, being shorter, quieter, and hoarser in the female. Other calls include a repeated "purrt" that is given during breeding season, for example while flying from nest sites or when other plovers intrude their territory. A single "churr" is mostly given by males while defending territory or offspring from other plovers. Outside the breeding season, a repeated "ti" is given when disturbed while resting, and is often followed by flight. Chicks make a "peep" call from up to two days before hatching while still in the egg, and until their first flight.

== Distribution and habitat ==
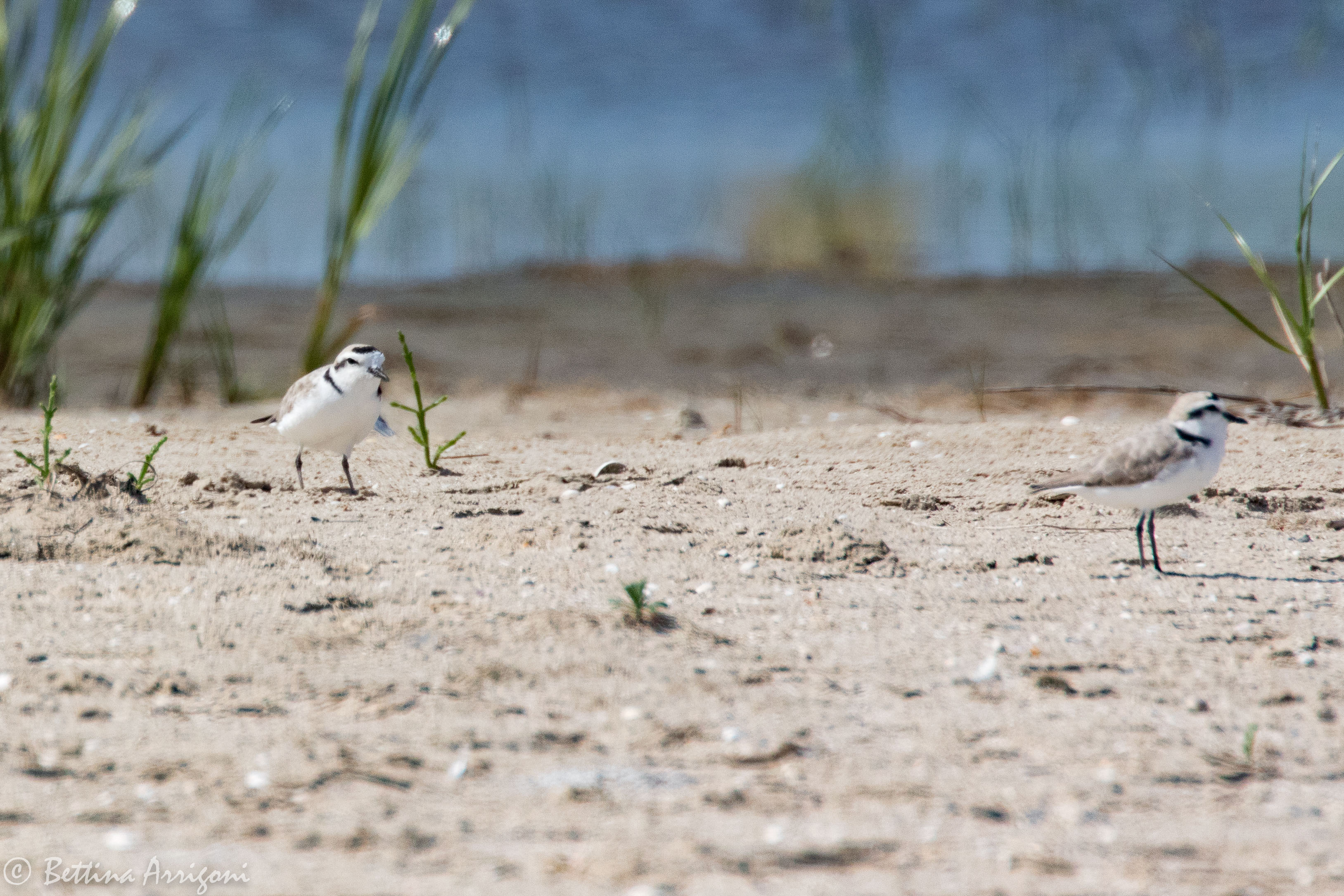
Snowy plovers in their habitat on Bolivar Peninsula, Texas

The snowy plover is distributed along the Pacific coast of North and South America, in areas inland of the US and Mexico, along the coast of the Gulf of Mexico, and on the Caribbean islands and Bermuda. On the Pacific coast, it breeds from south Washington down to Oaxaca in Mexico, and non-breeding individuals can be found as far south as Panama. In South America, it breeds from south Ecuador to Chiloé Island in Chile. In the Caribbean, breeding occurs eastwards as far as the Virgin Islands and Margarita Island. The coastal populations consist of both migratory and residential birds; migration occurs over relatively short distances north- or southward along the coast. Inland breeding populations exist in the US eastward to the Great Plains of Kansas and Oklahoma, as well as in Mexico north of Mexico City. These populations are mostly migratory, with western populations migrating to the Pacific coast, and the Great Plains populations to the Gulf of Mexico coast. Breeding has been recorded at elevations up to 3,000 m (9,800 ft).

The species inhabits open areas in which vegetation is absent or sparse, in particular coastal sand beaches and shores of salt or soda lakes. It also breeds on river bars that are located close to the coast, and adopts human-made habitats such as wastewater and salt evaporation ponds, dammed lakes, and dredge spoils. It requires the proximity of water, although it may breed on salt flats where only very little water remains.

== Behavior and ecology ==
=== Feeding ===
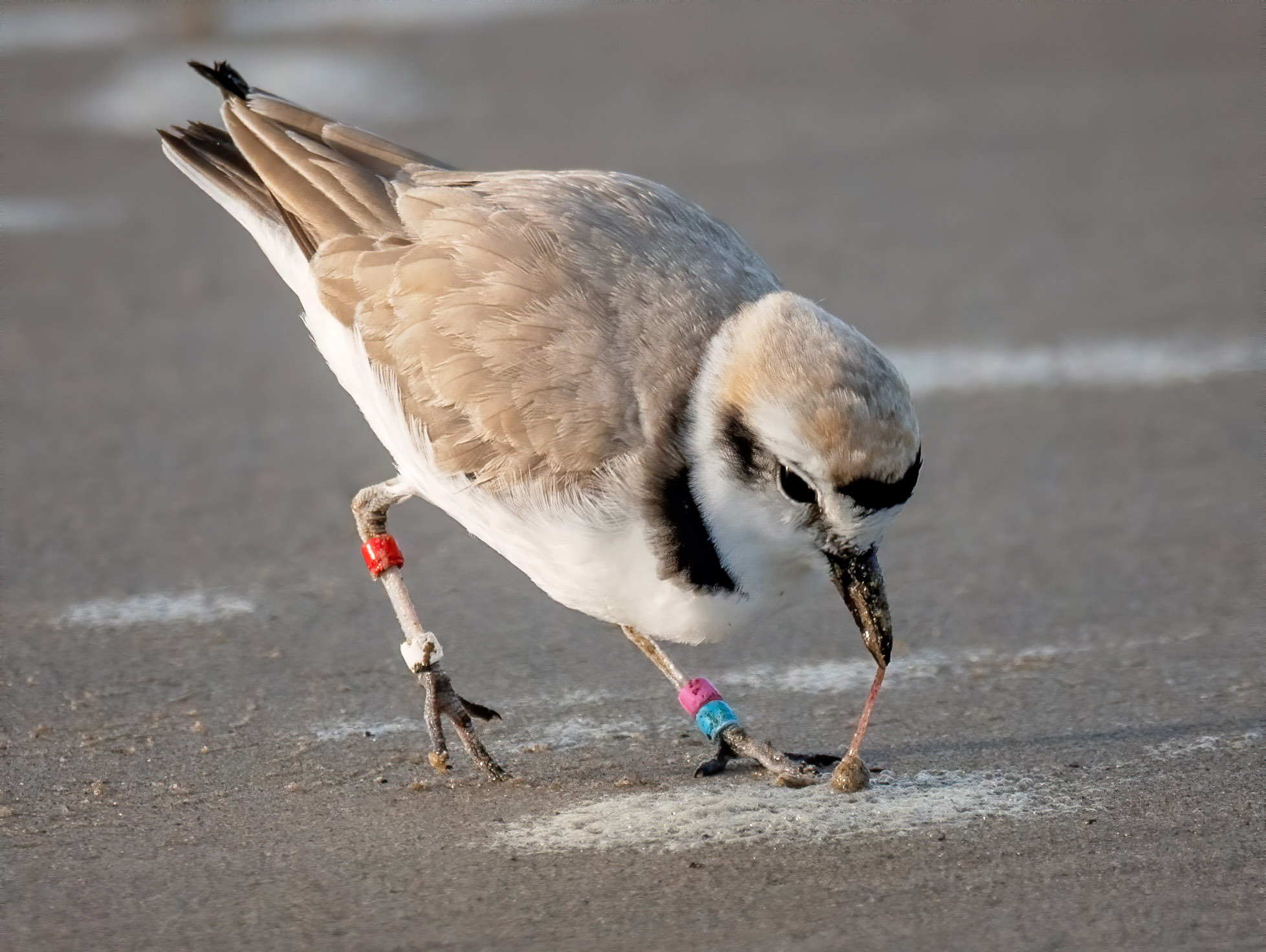
Snowy plover catching a worm

The species feeds on invertebrates such as crustaceans, worms, beetles, and flies. An analysis of feces from a coastal population in California during breeding season found beetles in 72%, flies in 44%, and insect larvae in 25% of the feces. Prey is taken from above and below the sand surface, from plants, and from carcasses. In inland habitats, snowy plovers usually forage on wet substrates that may be under a shallow water cover. As is typical for plovers, prey is found visually by briefly standing to scan the area, followed by running and capturing. Snowy plovers also forage by probing the substrate with their bills, by charging or hopping into accumulations of flies, and by "foot trembling" on wet substrates or in shallow water, where one foot shakes to stir up prey. Brine fly larvae are often shaken before consumption, and captured flies are often bitten two or three times. Snowy plovers may forage during day and night, with one individual observed feeding in almost complete darkness. Snowy plovers drink when fresh water is available, but when it is not, they can sustain themselves on the water content of their prey.

=== Territoriality and roosting ===
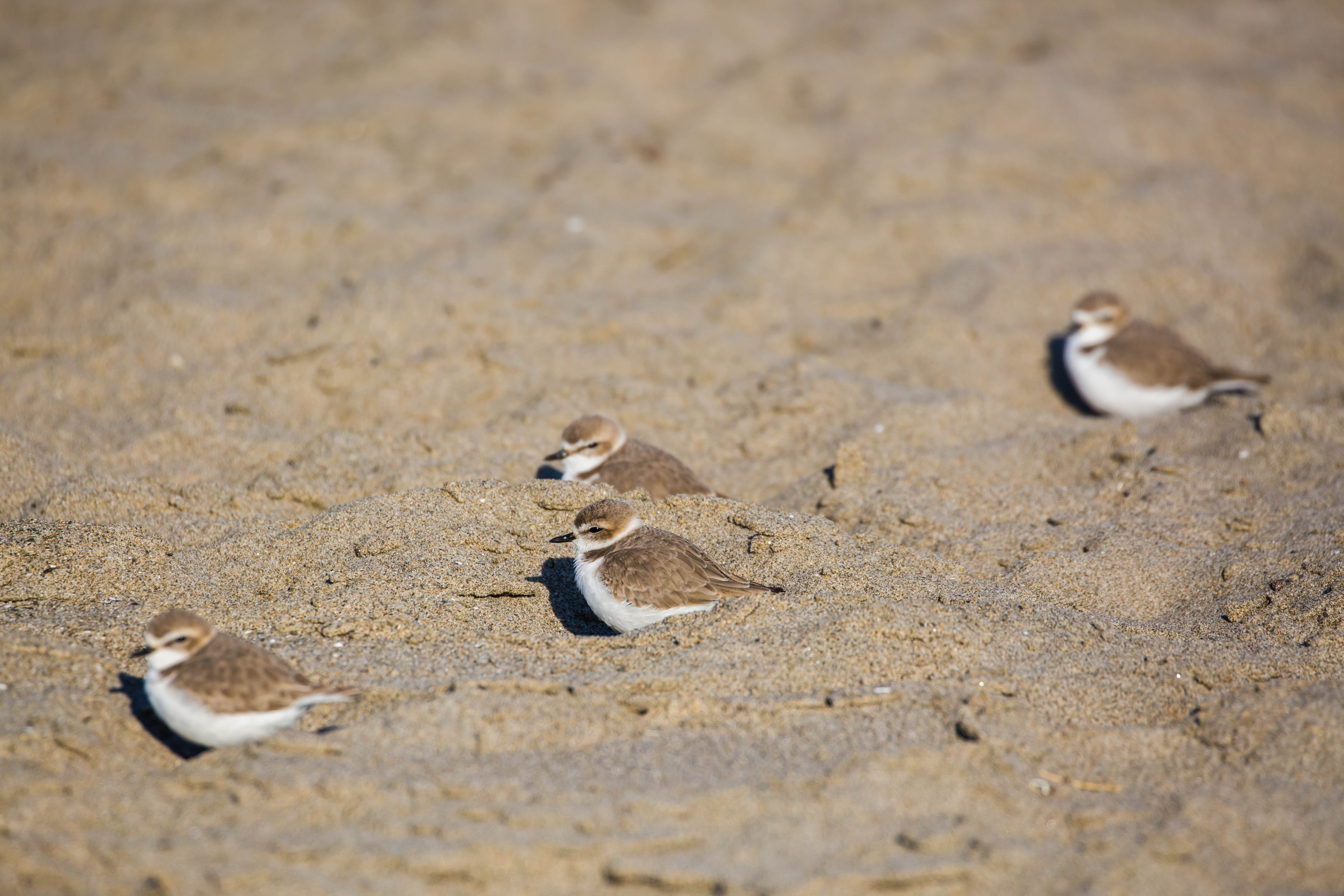
Roosting snowy plovers at Moss Landing State Beach, California

At the beginning of the breeding season, the male, while still unpaired, will establish and defend a territory, which is then advertised to a female by calling and excavating scrapes. A pair will continue to defend the territory. After the chicks hatch, the family will soon begin to move around, when the adults will defend the surrounding radius rather than a fixed territory. When defending a territory, males may attempt to intimidate intruders by using the "Upright Display" posture, in which the body is upright with erected breast feathers. They may also run or fly at, or fight with intruders. Fighting may involve jumping at each other breast-to-breast with flapping wings and mutual pecking and shoving. In some cases, combatants pull on each other's feathers, and may even pull out a tail feather. Fights with intermittent short breaks can last up to 1.5 hours. Territories are defended not only against other snowy plovers but also against some other bird species, including semipalmated plovers and whimbrels. Territories are probably not important for protecting food resources, as the plovers often feed in flocks up to 6 km (3.7 mi) away from their territories. In Kansas and Oklahoma, where the birds are more stationary, protection of feeding grounds could be more important. The size of territories is variable, and sizes between 0.1 and 1 ha (11,000 and 108,000 sq ft) have been reported.

Outside the breeding season, snowy plovers will often roost in groups of several to more than 300 birds. Roosting places are typically on the ground, often in depressions such as footprints (including those of humans) and vehicle tracks or behind objects such as driftwood.

=== Breeding ===
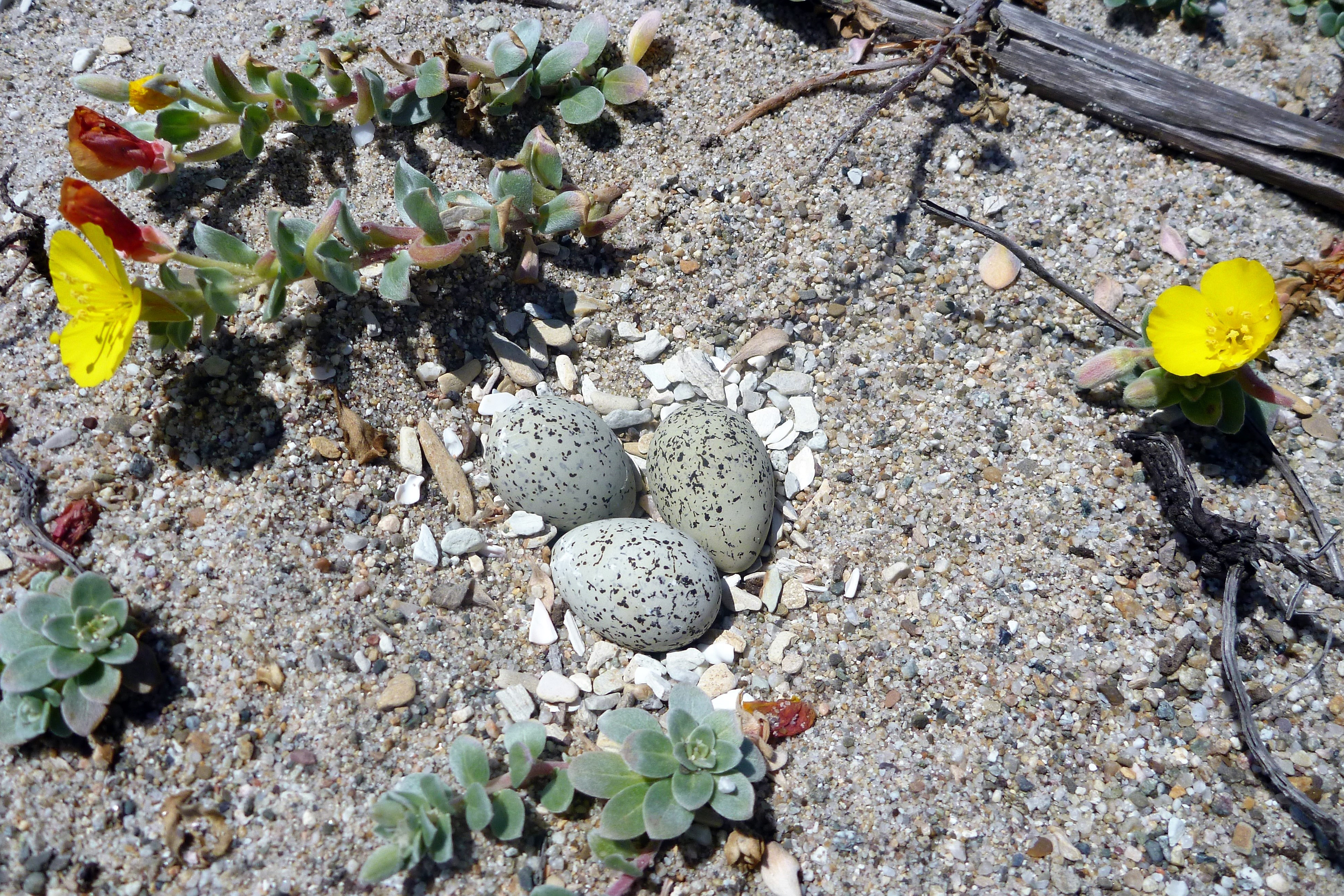
Nest scrape with three eggs

Snowy plovers are facultatively polygamous, with females, and less frequently males, often abandoning their mate soon after the chicks have hatched. The deserting female will then pair with a new male and renest, sometimes a few hundred kilometers away from its first brood, while the male will continue to rear the chicks. A 2021 study of a population at Ceuta, Mexico, found that females are more likely to abandon their broods when the chicks are likely to survive even in their absence, or when the chicks have a low probability of survival. The polygamy in this species could therefore be a strategy to maximize breeding success. Polygamy is most pronounced where the breeding season is long, when birds may start two, and sometimes three, broods per season. On the other hand, birds do generally not brood twice in the Great Plains, where the breeding season is short. A biased sex ratio also appears to favor polygamy: males are generally more common than females, with one study reporting that males were 1.4 times more common than females in California. The causes for such pronounced sex ratios are unknown. Rarely, males breed with two females at the same time. Pairs can also be reestablished in the next breeding season, which occurred in 32 to 45% of cases in central California, or within the same season in the third breeding attempt of the female. The polygamous mating system of the snowy plover is uncommon in birds, but the closely related Kentish plover shows a similar behavior.

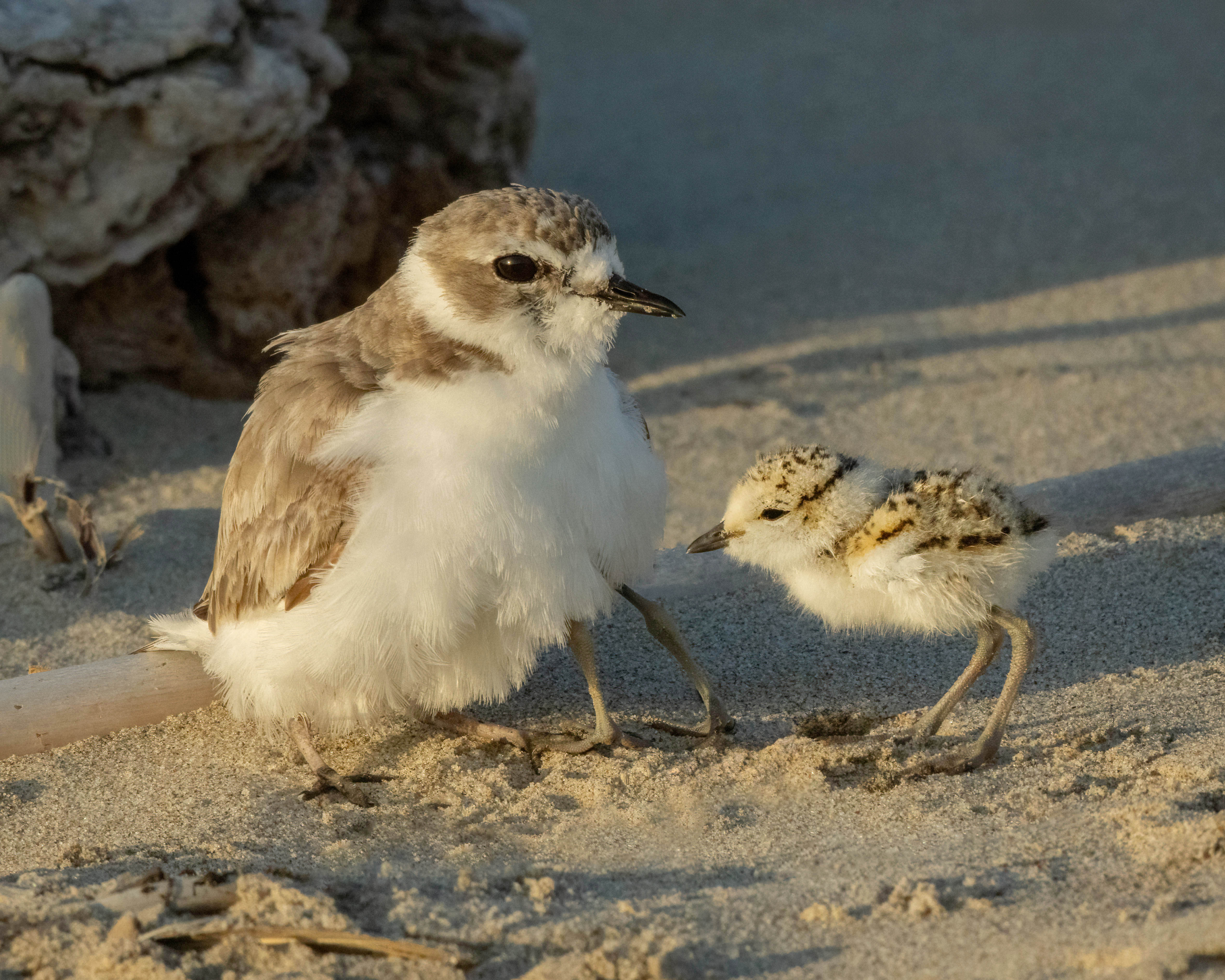
Adult with two chicks

Snowy plovers nest in nest scrapes that are excavated by the male as an important part of the courtship ritual. In the coastal areas of California, males excavated an average of 5.6 scrapes per territory. A scrape may be constructed within a few minutes, often near conspicuous landmarks such as rocks and grass patches. One of these scrapes is later selected by the pair for nesting, commonly the scrape where most copulations took place. Both before and during incubation, the adults continue to line the nest with small objects such as stones and shell pieces. Where the ground is too hard to construct scrapes, other depressions such as animal and vehicle tracks are chosen.

The species lays three eggs on average, but clutch size ranges from two to six eggs. When only a single egg is produced, the clutch is usually abandoned. Eggs are oval or asymmetric in shape and have a matte and smooth surface. In coastal California, they average at 31 mm (1.2 in) in length, 23 mm (0.91 in) in width, and 8.5 grams (0.30 oz) in weight, which accounts for 20% of the body weight of the female. Egg color is brownish-yellow, with dark brown or black speckles that become more numerous towards the blunt end of the egg. The female lays one egg every 47 to 118 hours until the clutch is complete. The time interval between egg laying and hatching varies geographically and seasonally, ranging between 23 and 49 days. Continuous incubation starts upon clutch completion; while still incomplete, males and females spend only about a quarter of the daytime incubating. In coastal areas of California, females tend to incubate during the day, while males incubate at night. The reason for this pattern is unclear, and hypotheses include a need of the female to feed at night to regain energy lost from egg laying and the need of the male to defend the territory during daytime. Under hot conditions greater 40 °C (104 °F), the male and female take turns at least once per hour.

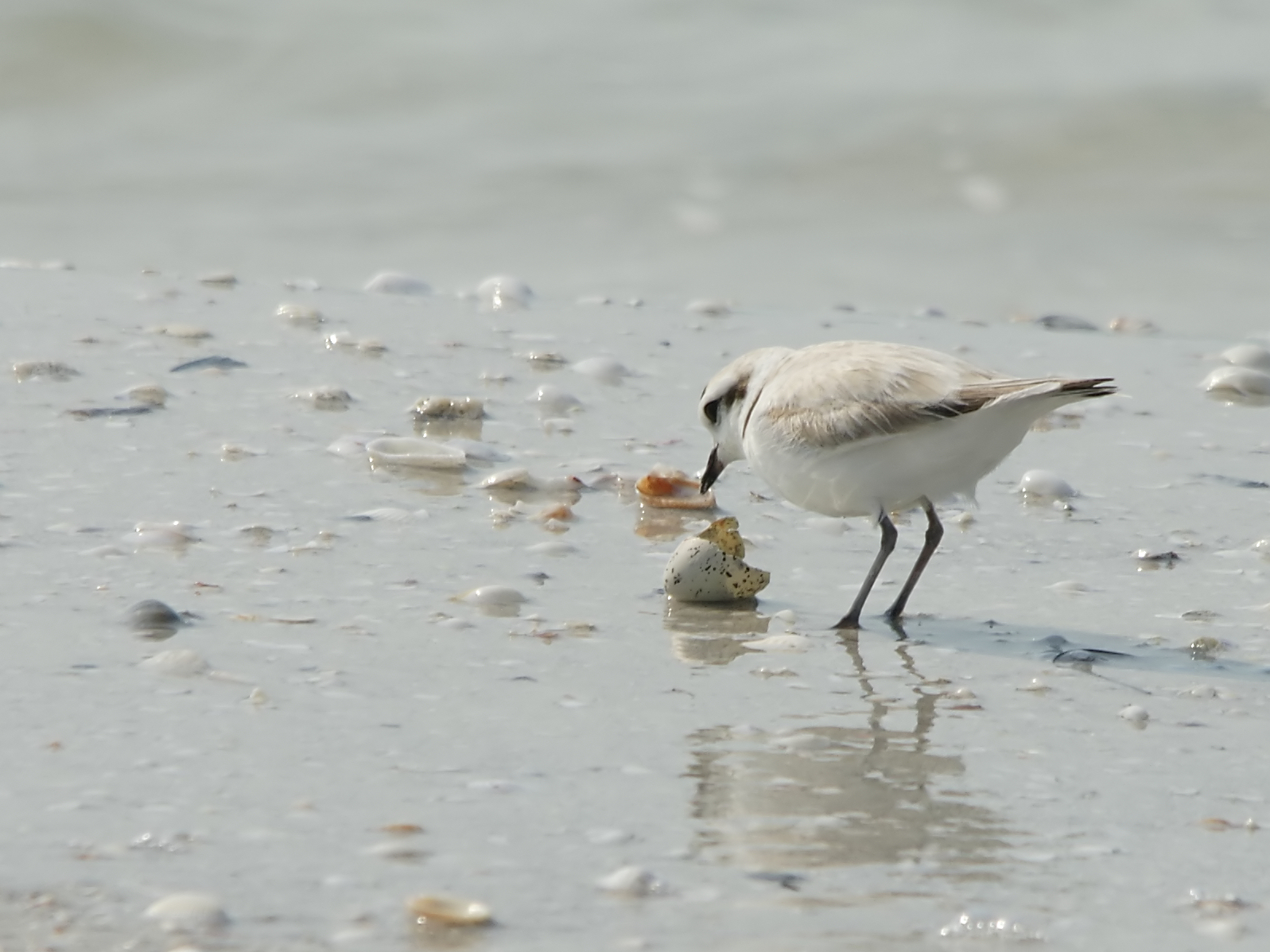
Snowy plover standing over half of an empty egg

A day before hatching, chicks and parents begin to communicate by calling. After hatching, the parents will carry eggshells away from the nest. The chicks are precocial and able to walk and swim one to three hours after hatching. Parents do not feed their chicks, but will lead them to feeding areas. Parents will continue to brood their chicks after hatching – in the coastal areas of northern California, chicks less than 10 days old were brooded for an average of 58% of each day. In western North America, chicks are looked after for 29 to 47 days after hatching, often by the male after the female has deserted. In the more eastern populations, however, chicks are often cared for until they fledge.

=== Predators and mortality ===
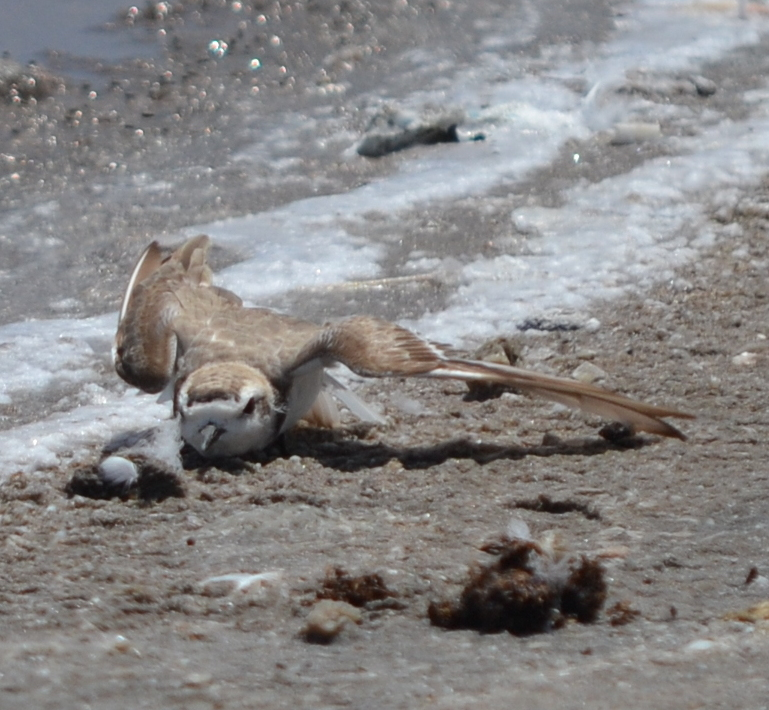
Snowy plover feigning a broken wing to distract predators from its offspring

Adults are preyed upon by birds of prey and various mammals including feral cats and foxes, with a wider range of predators preying on chicks and eggs. Adults will usually run away from an approaching predator or human, but may also take flight. Approaching birds of prey cause adults to duck on their nests, while roosting flocks will take flight to form a highly coordinated flight formation in which they move back and forth. Parents will signal their chicks to lie flat against the ground when sensing potential danger. They may then attempt to distract predators from their chicks by calling and flying around. Parents also use injury feigning, when they will run away and move their wings as if they are broken, or lie on the ground while crouching or flapping.

Common diseases include botulism, and common parasites include bird lice. The average life span has been estimated at 2.7 years, and the oldest snowy plover on record was at least 15 years old.

== Status and conservation ==
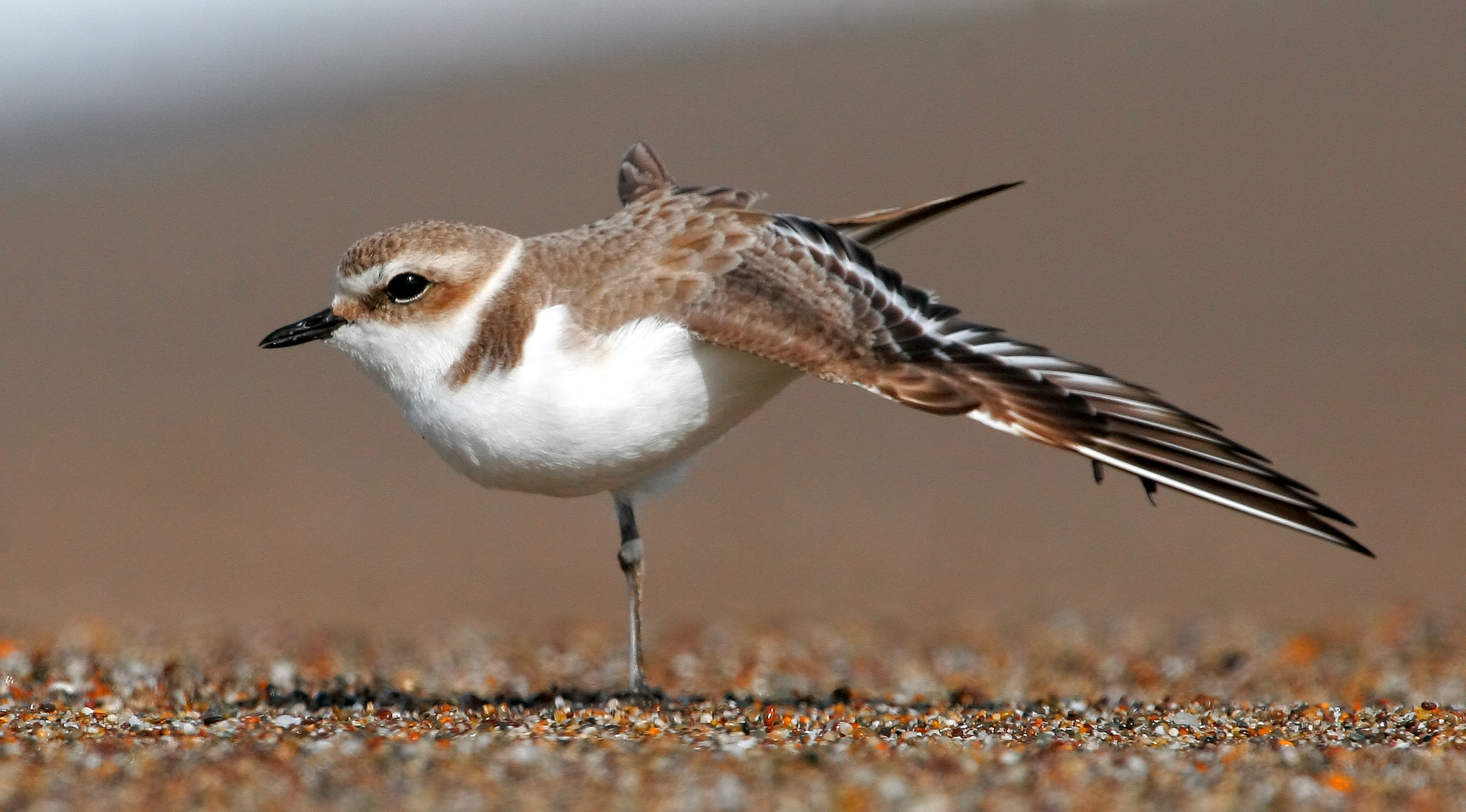
At Point Reyes National Seashore in California

The snowy plover is among the rarest endemic shorebirds in the Americas. Since 2014, it is listed as "Near Threatened" by the IUCN because of a moderately rapid population decline caused primarily by habitat degradation and human disturbance. In the US Pacific coast, the species is thought to have lost 50 out of 78 breeding sites since 1970, and in the Great Plains of Texas, the decline is estimated to have been larger than 75% between 1998 and 2009. Subtropical and tropical populations, although less studied and monitored than those of higher latitudes, may be similarly threatened. As of 2020, the global population is estimated at 24,000 to 31,000 mature individuals. Counting both juveniles and mature individuals, the North American population has been estimated at 25,869; the population in and around the Gulf of Mexico at 2,500; and the South American population at 8,000 to 10,000 individuals.

=== Causes of decline ===
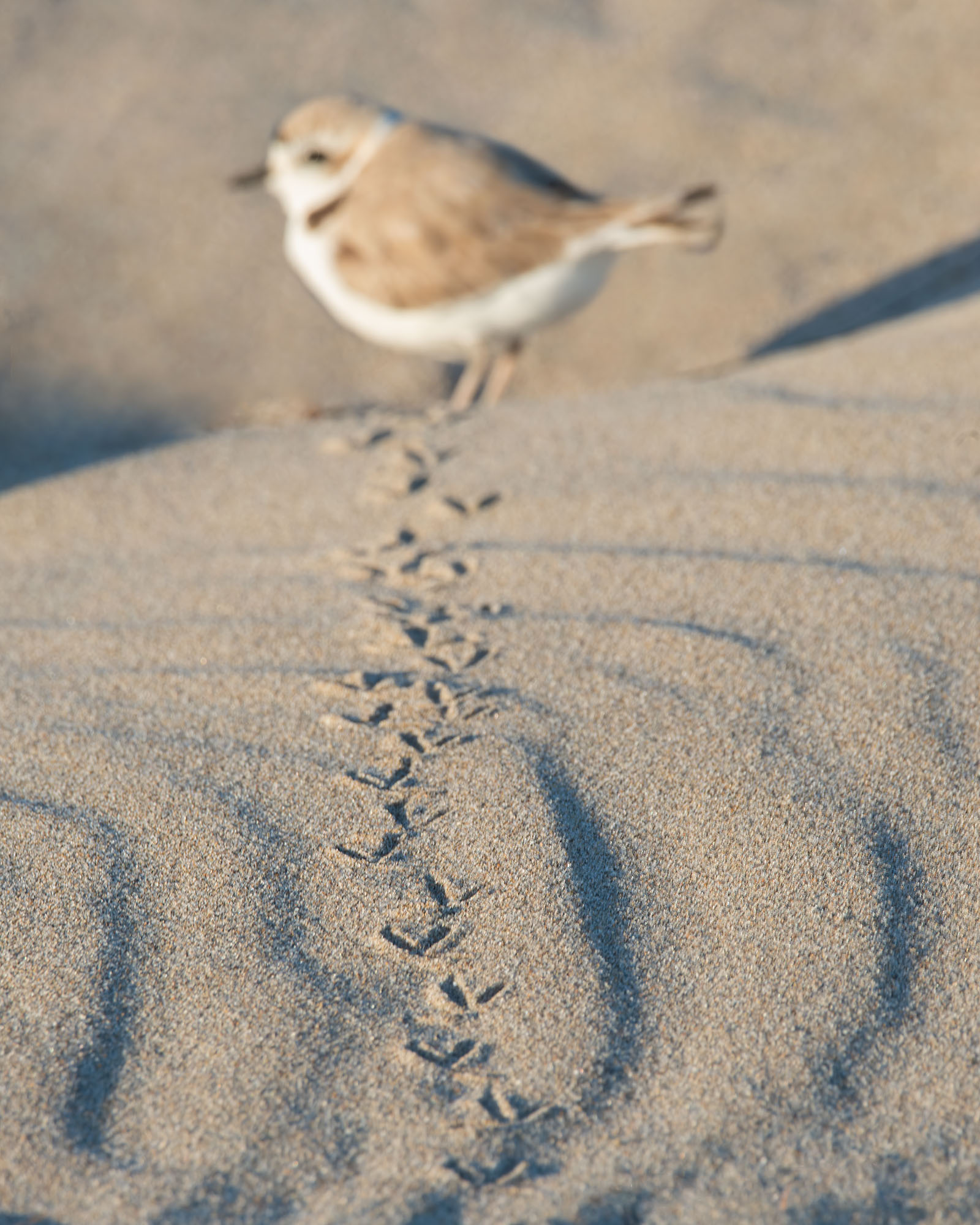
Trackway of a snowy plover

Habitat degradation is a major cause for the declines in both coastal and inland populations in the US. Many coastal beaches have been developed for recreational use. Periodic raking of beaches to remove garbage and natural debris such as kelp causes plovers to abandon breeding areas, and reduces biodiversity and biomass of the invertebrates the plovers feed on. Dune habitat was lost to the invasive European beachgrass, which had originally been planted to stabilize dunes. This species, as well as the American beachgrass from the Atlantic coast, have replaced native foredune vegetation in most of the North American Pacific coast. In the Great Salt Plains in Oklahoma, controlled flooding, as well as an invasive shrub, the French tamarisk, have destroyed much plover habitat. In the Great Plains of Texas, sinking groundwater levels due to water extraction has been identified as the primary cause of decline. River habitats in Kansas and Oklahoma have been decimated by the extraction of water, the erection of water reservoirs, and vegetation growth. Habitat is lost to housing and urbanization adjacent to beaches. Less significant are habitat losses due to the trapping of sediments by dams and jetties that affect coastal erosion and sedimentation. Habitat degradation is also a major concern for populations of lower altitudes. For example, around Ceuta in Mexico, the species is affected by large-scale removal of protected mangrove forests and illegal development of beaches, but also by the spread of mangroves into abandoned evaporation ponds that were adopted as habitats by the plovers. A 2017 analysis concluded that the Ceuta population will probably be extinct in 25 years if no further conservation measures are implemented.

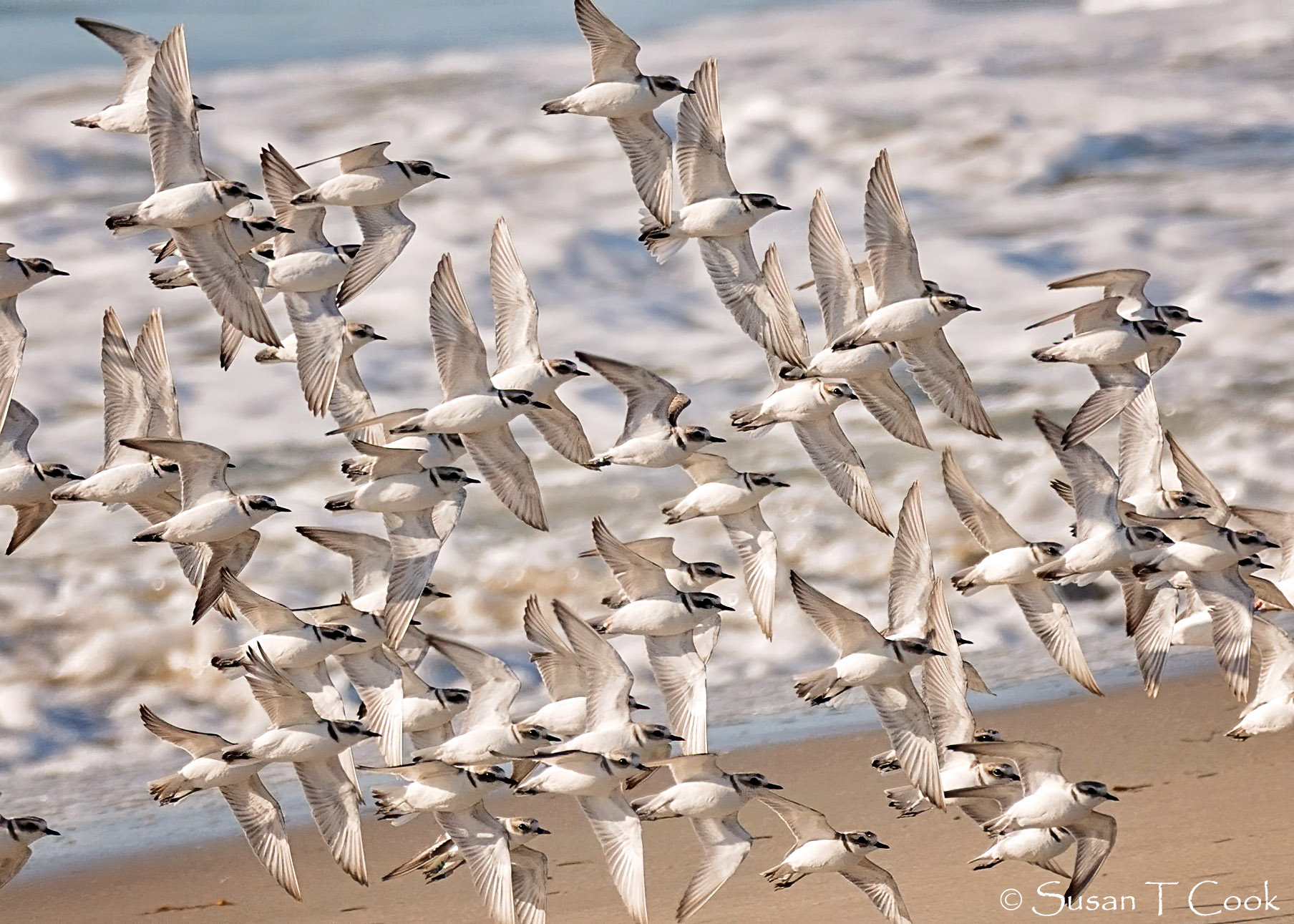
Snowy plover flight formation

On US beaches, disturbance by humans and dogs is another significant cause for the abandonment of areas. One 2001 study found that at a public beach at Coal Oil Point, each plover was disturbed every 27 minutes on average during weekends and every 43 minutes during the week. The study further found that the plovers have been more sensitive to dogs than to humans, and that most disturbances occurred when the plovers were approached by less than 30 m (98 ft). A 2003 study of two beaches at Point Reyes National Seashore found that chick mortality was 69% greater on weekends compared to weekdays in 1999 and 72% greater in 2000, demonstrating the negative effects of human recreation. Nests have also been directly crushed by vehicles, walking humans, and, in inland populations, by cattle. An experiment with quail eggs at Sands Beach in Santa Barbara County, California, revealed an 8% daily risk of eggs being trampled by humans when outside protected areas.

Several additional threats have been documented. Predation on chicks and eggs by crows, ravens, skunks, and invasive red foxes has intensified in some areas. Crows and ravens may be attracted to plover breeding areas by human food sources. Several instances have been documented where environmental pollution affected populations. Oil spills have been a repeated threat, such as the New Carissa spill of 1999 that is known to have killed a minimum of 45 plovers. At Point Reyes National Seashore, mercury contamination has been identified as the cause for a high proportion of unhatched eggs. A 2018 study found that 98% of analyzed plovers in the Southern Great Plains had blood selenium levels exceeding the toxicity threshold. Discarded monofilament fishing lines are a known threat, but their impact on populations is unknown. In the future, effects of climate change, such as droughts and habitat loss due to sea level rise, are likely to become significant threats.

=== Conservation measures ===
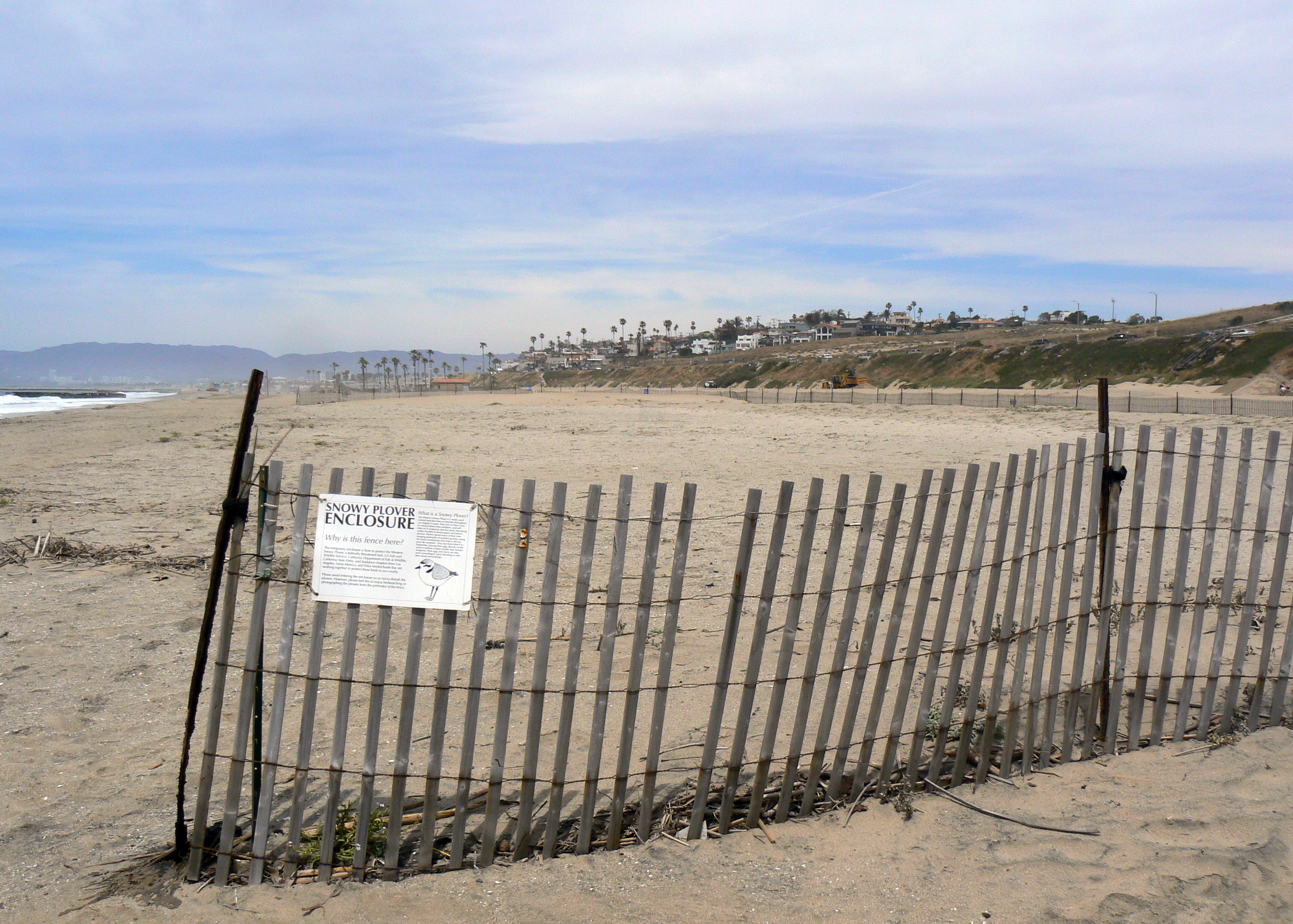
Fencing of a breeding area to protect against disturbance by humans at Dockweiler State Beach, California

In 1993, the Pacific coast population of the US was listed as a "threatened" under the Endangered Species Act of 1973, and a recovery plan followed in 2007. The plan focuses on three main conservation measures: closure of upper beach areas to the public during breeding season; protection against predators; and habitat restoration. Closure of beach areas was most effective when including fencing against dogs and a 30 m buffer zone. Egg predators were controlled by both fencing individual nests and predator removal. Habitat restoration focused on the removal of the invasive European beachgrass. Measures are also in place to protect some other snowy plover habitats elsewhere in the US. In the Great Salt Plains in Oklahoma, dams and fences were erected around nesting areas to prevent flooding and predation, but proved ineffective. In Mexico, the species has been listed as "threatened" since 2010.

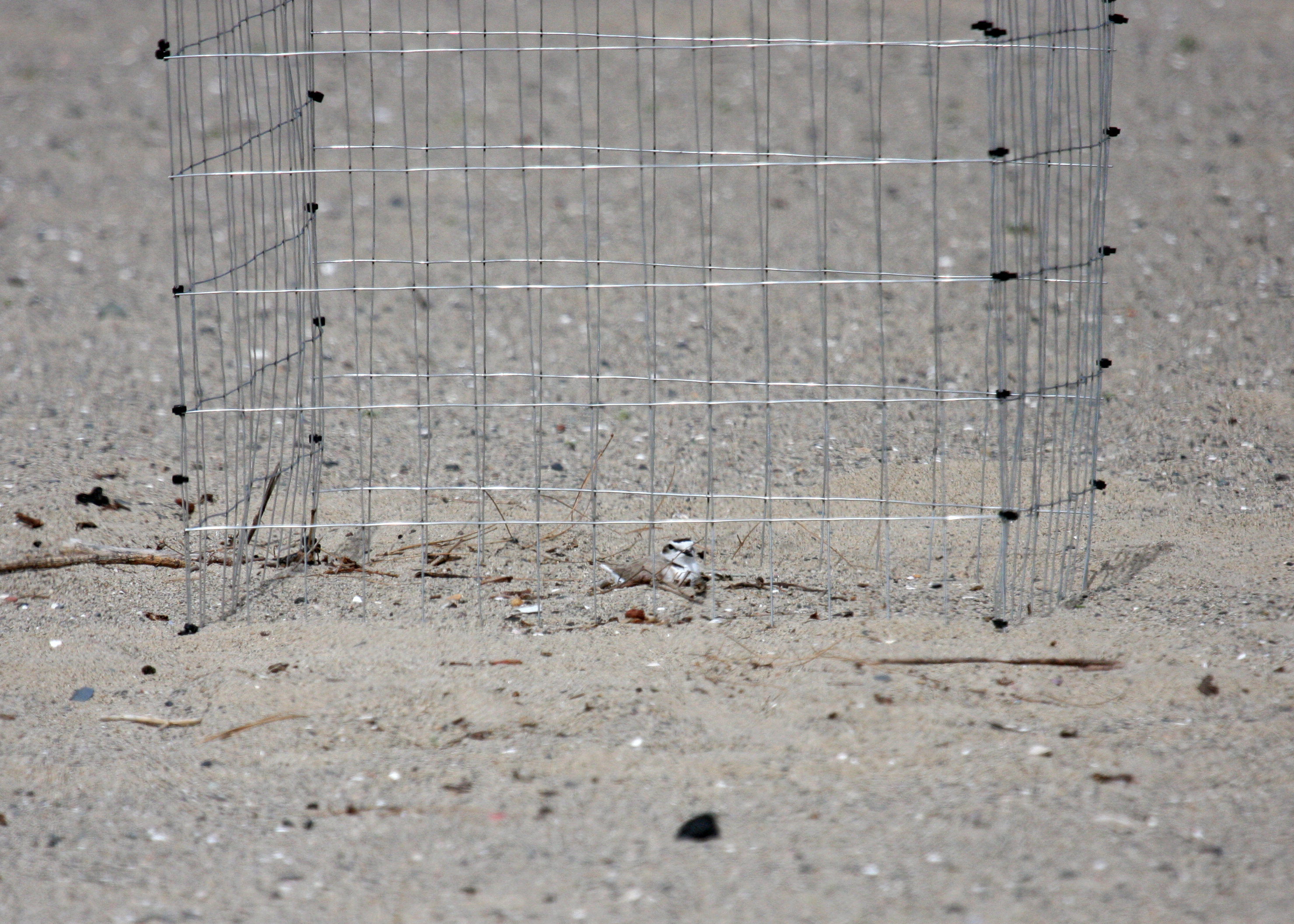
Enclosure to protect snowy plover nests from egg predators at Santa Monica State Beach

Even though the global population is declining, conservation efforts have led to local increases in plover populations. In central Chile, protection of a small stretch of beach against human disturbance resulted in an increase of the local population, as was reported in 2001. The first instance of snowy plovers reoccupying a breeding area following its protection from human disturbance was documented in 2006 at Sands Beach, Santa Barbara County, where barriers are in use since 2001. As of March 2023, conservation efforts have been particularly successful in Oregon, where numbers increased to 483 birds, from just 55 birds in 1993. This increase was possible due to roping off 40–50 mi (64–80 km) of dry sand on beaches, as well as the removal of invasive grasses. In California, the population is estimated at 1,830 birds as of March 2023.
