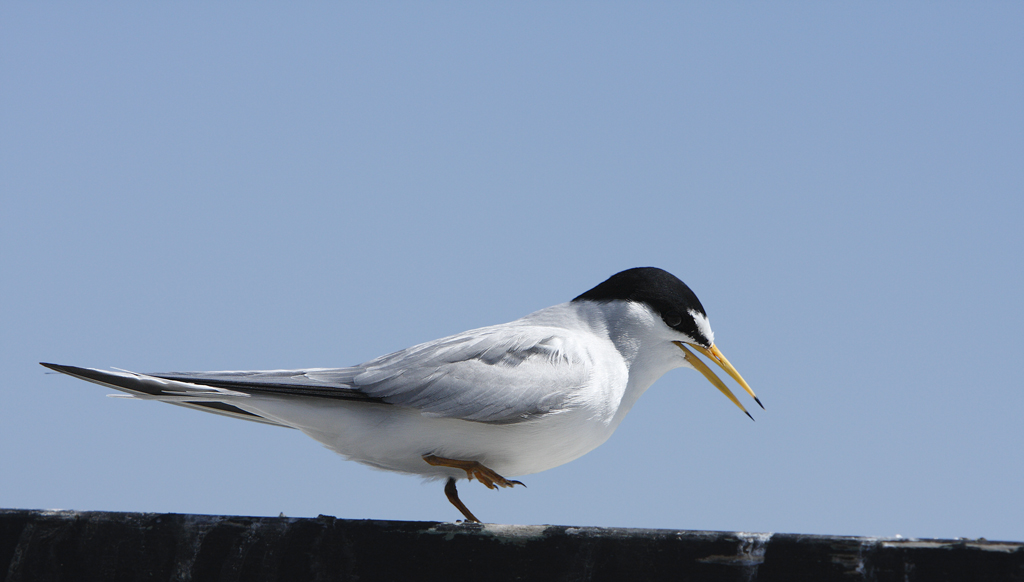
- At San Luis Obispo, California

Conservation status
- Endangered (ESA)

Scientific classification
- Domain: Eukaryota
- Kingdom: Animalia
- Phylum: Chordata
- Class: Aves
- Order: Charadriiformes
- Family: Laridae
- Genus: Sternula
- Species: S. antillarum
- Subspecies: S. a. browni

Trinomial name
- Sternula antillarum browni (Mearns, 1916)

Synonyms
- Sterna albifrons browni Mearns, 1916; Sterna antillarum browni Mearns, 1916

= California least tern =

Subspecies of bird

The California least tern (Sternula antillarum browni) is a subspecies of least tern that breeds primarily in bays of the Pacific Ocean within a very limited range of Southern California, in San Francisco Bay and in northern regions of Mexico. This migratory bird is a U.S. federally listed endangered subspecies. The total population of the subspecies amounted to 582 breeding pairs in 1974, when census work on this bird began. While numbers have gradually increased with its protected status, the species is still vulnerable to population decline through natural disasters, predation, and human disturbance.

== Nesting and breeding behavior ==
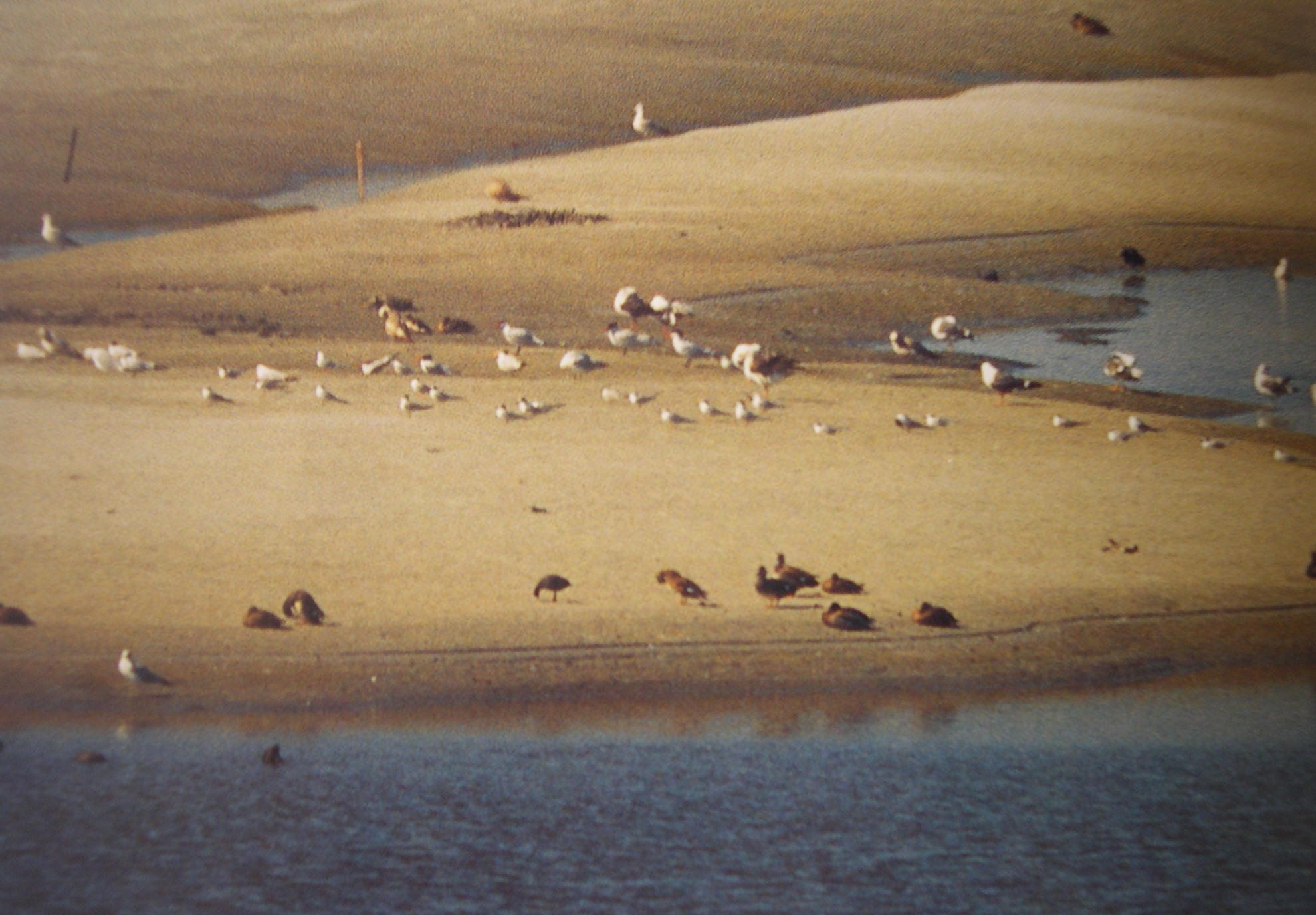
Least terns and snowy plovers nesting at Batiquitos Lagoon

Wintering locations are actually unknown, but suspected to include the South American Pacific Coast. The California least tern arrives at its breeding grounds in late April. Courtship typically takes place removed from the nesting colony site, usually on an exposed tidal flat or beach. Only after courtship has confirmed mate selection does nesting begin by mid-May and is usually complete by mid-June. Nests are situated on barren to sparsely vegetated places near water, normally on sandy or gravelly substrates. In the San Francisco Bay region, breeding typically takes place on abandoned salt flats. Where the surface is hard, this species may use an artificial indentation (such as a deep dried footprint) to form the nest basin. The breeding colonies are not dense and may appear along marine or estuarine shores in areas free from humans or predators. The nest density may be as low as several per acre, but in San Diego County, densities of 200 nests per acre have been observed. The clutch size can be anywhere from one to four eggs, but most commonly consists of two or three. Both female and male incubate the eggs for a period of about three weeks, and both parents tend the semi-precocial young. Young birds can fly at age four weeks. After formation of the new families, groupings of birds may appear at lacustrine settings in proximity to the coast. Late season nesting may be renests or late season arrival activity. In any case, the bulk of the population has left California by the end of August.

== Feeding and roosting characteristics ==
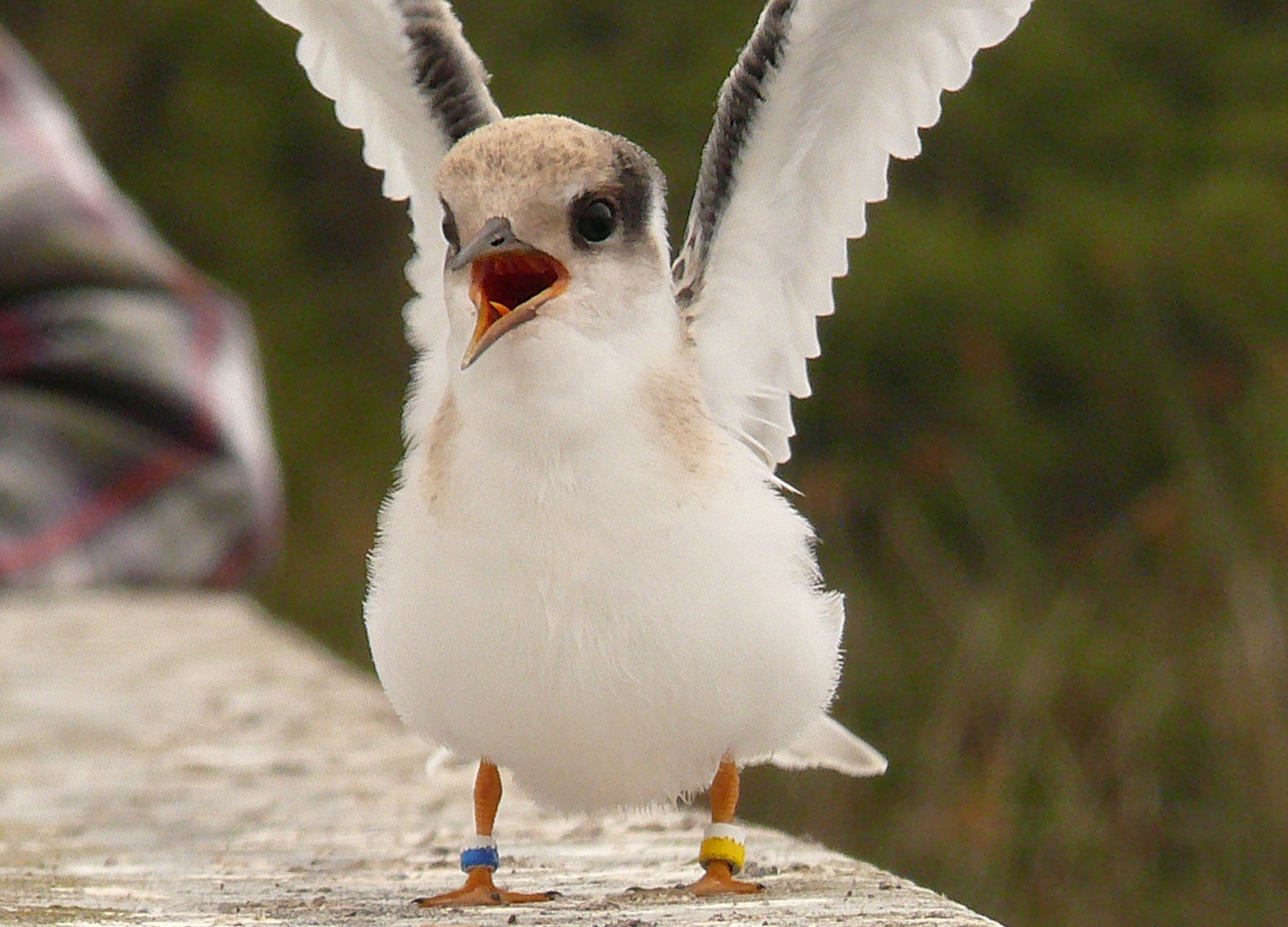
Juvenile preparing to receive food from parent

The California least tern hunts primarily in shallow estuaries and lagoons, or beyond the breakers, even beyond 24 km offshore in areas of upwelling, and where smaller fishes are abundant. They hover until spotting prey, and then plunge into the water without full submersion to extract prey. In the bays and lagoons of Southern California and northern Mexico, the favored prey include anchovy, smelt, silversides, shiner surfperch and small crustaceans. The terns often feed near shore in the open ocean, especially in proximity to lagoons or bay mouths (Baird 2010). Adults do not require cover, so they commonly roost on the open ground. After young chicks are three days old, they are brooded less frequently by parents and require wind blocks and shade. Notable disruption of colonies can occur from predation by burrowing owls and American kestrels (Collins, 1980). Depredation by domestic cats has been observed in at least one colony (California Wildlife, 1990).

== Relation to other least terns ==
The California least tern is a subspecies of the least tern (Sternula antillarum) that breeds on the United States Atlantic coast from Maine to Florida and Texas. Sternula antillarum is also found in breeding grounds along rivers in the midwest and Great Plains of the United States. Both the Californian subspecies and the nominate race of least tern are approximately 23 centimeters in length. Both have conspicuous black markings on their outermost primaries and fly over water with a distinctive hunchback appearance, with bills pointing slightly downward. The least tern was itself formerly often considered conspecific with the little tern Sternula albifrons, which has an extensive Old World distribution. The little tern differs from the least tern mainly in that its rump and tail are white, not gray, and it has a different call.

== Bibliography ==
- Audubon Handbook: Western Birds, McGraw Hill Book Company (1988) ISBN 0-07-019977-9
- P. Baird, "Foraging Study of California Least Terns in San Diego Bay and Near Ocean Waters," 2010. Unpubl. Comp. Rept. United States Navy.
- B. Massey, Breeding Biology of the California least tern, Proceedings Linn. Society, New York 72:1-24 (1974)
- California Wildlife, Volume II, Birds, ed, by David C. Zeiner, William F. Laudenslayer and Kenneth E. Meyer, published by the California Department of Fish and Game, November 1988.
- Gary Deghi, C. Michael Hogan et al., Biological Assessment for the Proposed Tijuana/San Diego Joint International Wastewater Treatment Plant, Publication of the United States Environmental Protection Agency Region IX, Earth Metrics Incorporated, Burlingame, CA with Harvey and Stanley, Alviso, CA
- L. Collins and S. Bailey, California least tern nesting season at Alameda Naval Air Station, 1980 Admin. Rep. 25pp.
- Olsen and Larsson, Terns of Europe and North America ISBN 0-7136-4056-1
