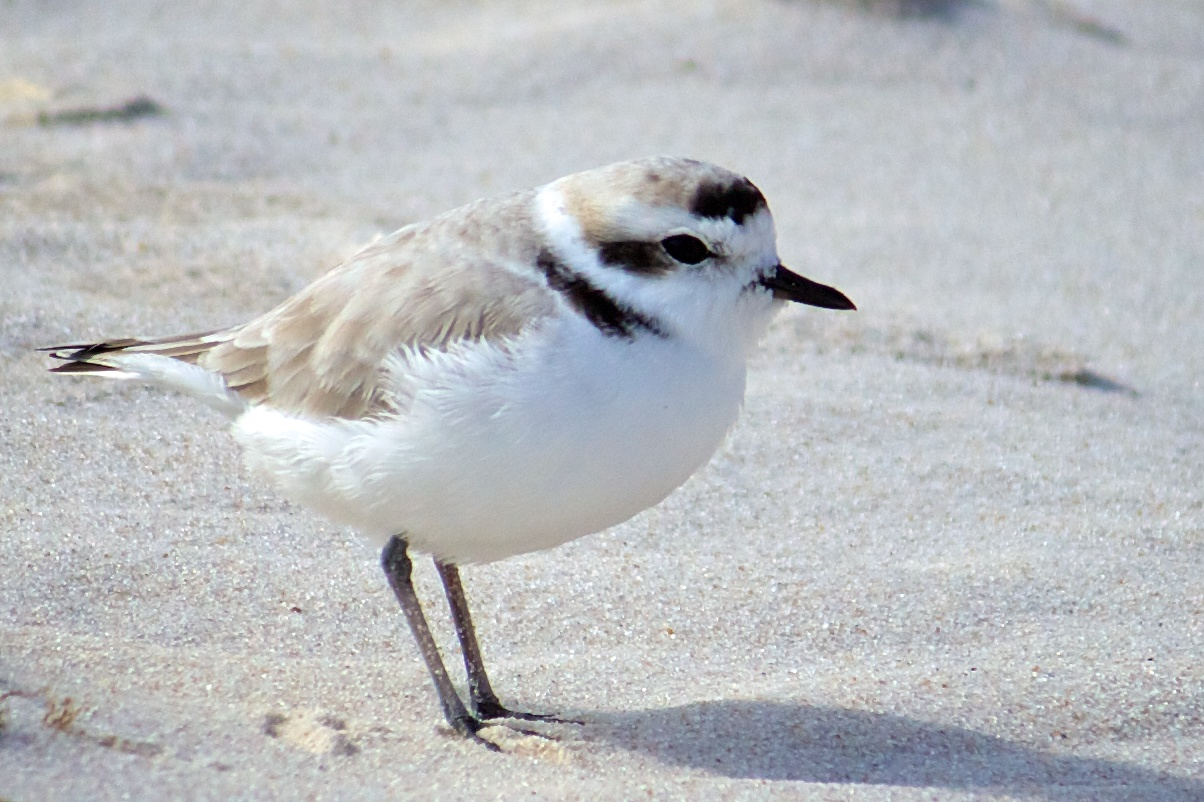

Conservation status
- Vulnerable (NatureServe)

Scientific classification
- Kingdom: Animalia
- Phylum: Chordata
- Class: Aves
- Order: Charadriiformes
- Family: Charadriidae
- Genus: Anarhynchus
- Species: A. nivosus
- Subspecies: A. n. nivosus

Trinomial name
- Anarhynchus nivosus nivosus (Cassin, 1858)

= Western snowy plover =

Subspecies of bird

The western snowy plover (Anarhynchus nivosus nivosus) is a small wader in the plover bird family. They are currently federally listed under the U.S. Endangered Species Act as Threatened. Human activity, habitat loss and predation are the biggest contributors to population degradation. A recovery plan was approved under the U.S. Fish and Wildlife Service in 2007. Recovery actions and monitoring are crucial for these vulnerable seabirds.

== Taxonomy ==
The western snowy plover was originally described by American ornithologist John Cassin in 1858. Western snowy plover is a subspecies of the snowy plover (Anarhynchus nivosus), of the genus Anarhynchus (formerly Charadrius). The species name nivosus comes from the Latin word niveus meaning 'snowy'.

The snowy plover was formerly considered conspecific with the Kentish plover of the Old World, but the two are now considered separate species.

== Description ==
Western snowy plovers are experts at blending into their environment. Plovers are shades of tan, brown, and black with white underbellies. They have a white collar as well as dark tan legs. Characteristic dark patches are displayed on the sides of their neck, and on top of the forehead. Adult males can be distinguished from females by their black crown, dark ear coverts and fore-neck patch. When females also present with the black crown, basic male and female plumage is indistinguishable. Juveniles have consistent mottling of light and dark tans to match the sand nests. The breeding season, March through September, is the easiest time to tell males and females apart. Males have a rust-coloured cap at the beginning of the season.

== Distribution ==
Western snowy plovers are migratory birds but are also year-round residents in the southern locations. Their breeding and nesting range includes the western coast of the United States; Washington and northern Utah to southern California, wintering in Baja California, Mexico.

== Habitat ==
Nesting sites are found on sandy beaches of open ocean shores, barren shores of non-tidal salt flat lakes and alkaline lakes in the interior of western United States. Western snowy plovers need open plains to feed on invertebrates and be vigilant towards predators. Sand is crucial for nest building. Nests are made in shallow depressions of sand called nest scrapes; added vegetation provides cover for their eggs. Too much vegetation can be an issue; American beachgrass from the East Coast and European beachgrass are invasive species that were originally transplanted to stabilize sand dunes. The invasive grasses have replaced much of the native vegetation and taken up dune habitat of the western snowy plover.

== Behaviour ==
Western snowy plovers are known to run to catch food or flee and crouch when threatened. They only fly when necessary for migration or when threatened by predators like raptors, ravens or crows. Males are known to be aggressive and will charge at other male plovers and birds. Plovers are territorial. When broods are too close, adults fight other parents and peck chicks of other plovers that approach.

Western snowy plovers congregate in flocks of fewer than 300 and practice preening, scratching, stretching and bathing in shallow water. They can be seen standing on one leg when cold, and periodically sleeping when roosting.

=== Vocalizations ===
Western snowy plovers use calls like, "churr" to signal their chicks that danger is near. The chicks will flatten themselves against the sand to hide. Chicks will "peep" until they are ready to fly. Other typical calls are variations of "tu-wheet". Females are typically quieter and sound hoarse. During breeding season, "purrt" or "churr" can be heard to defend their nest. Outside the breeding period, many "ti" calls are sounded if disturbed.

=== Diet ===
Western snowy plovers are active foragers and visual predators. Their diet includes invertebrates, insects and crustaceans. Typical prey items are juvenile mole crabs, brine fly larvae, beetles, flies, snails, clams, polychaete worms, and amphipods. Plovers use the "stop and run" method to spot prey and capture it. Another method is to open their mouths and run at swarms of kelp and wrack flies, snapping their beaks. During winter, plovers build up their fat reserves to prepare for migration north for the breeding season.

=== Reproduction ===
Western snowy plovers have two broods of 2-6 eggs per year. Eggs measure 2.8-3.4 cm by 2.1-2.4 cm. Plovers will produce a third brood if the breeding season is long due to late warm weather. Typical nesting season is March to September, peak nesting time is mid-April to August. Nests are made by the male as a part of the courtship ritual, the male will dig a shallow depression in the sand, then line the pit with stones and shell pieces to prevent the eggs from overheating. Eggs have a 26-33 day incubation period, females attend the brood during the day and males attend at night. Eggs are well camouflaged with a speckled, sandy colouration.

Once hatched, plover chicks are well-developed, precocial, and cared for by the male parent. Females leave their first brood to breed with other males. Within days of hatching, the chicks can run, forage, swim and leave the nest as soon as their down feather coat dries.

During the early days of a western plover chick's life, if a predator is near the attending parent will perform a distraction display known as the "broken-wing" display. the parent acts injured to lure the threat away from their young. Alternatively, the parent will fly flapping vigorously or run erratically to divert the attention of the predator.

== Threatened ==
Effective April 5, 1993, the Pacific Coast population of the western snowy plover is listed as threatened under the Endangered Species Act of 1973. From July 19, 2012, habitat along the California, Oregon, and Washington coasts are listed as critical for the survival of the Pacific distinct population segment.

Predation, urban development, introduction of beachgrass and nonnative species contribute to the degradation of western snowy plover nesting area and population. Common Ravens are known nest predators of the western snowy plover. Recent human activity provided ravens with more food, increasing their population density in the western United States, which threatens the plover population. Other predators include harrier, gull, coyote, fox, feral cat and skunk.

== See also ==
- Guadalupe-Nipomo Dunes
- Kentish Plover
