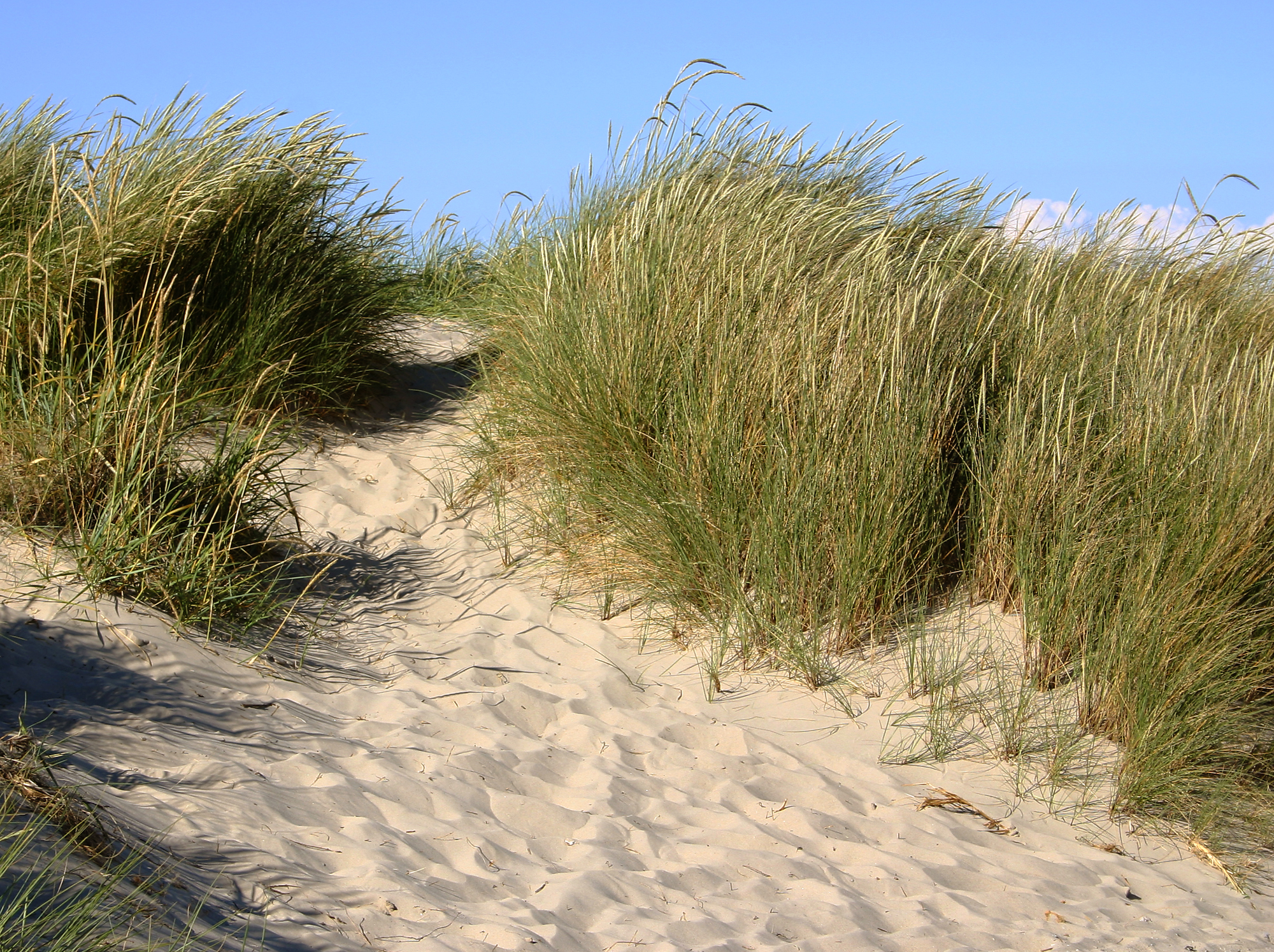

Scientific classification
- Kingdom: Plantae
- Clade: Tracheophytes
- Clade: Angiosperms
- Clade: Monocots
- Clade: Commelinids
- Order: Poales
- Family: Poaceae
- Genus: Ammophila
- Species: A. arenaria

Binomial name
- Ammophila arenaria (L.) Link

Synonyms
- Arundo arenaria L.; Ammannia coccinea purpurea (Lam.) Koehne; Ammannia teres (Raf.); Calamagrostis arenaria (L.) Roth; Ammophila australis is a synonym of Ammophila arenaria subspecies australis (Mabille) M.Laínz

= Ammophila arenaria =

Species of flowering plant in the grass family

Ammophila arenaria, syn. Calamagrostis arenaria, is a species of grass in the family Poaceae native to Europe and North Africa. It is known by the common name marram or marram grass. It is one of two species of the genus Ammophila. It is native to the coastlines of Europe and North Africa where it grows in the sands of beach dunes. It is a perennial grass forming stiff, hardy clumps of erect stems up to 1.2 metres (3.9 ft) in height. It grows from a network of thick rhizomes which give it a sturdy anchor in its sand substrate and allow it to spread upward as sand accumulates. These rhizomes can grow laterally by 2 metres (6 ft 7 in) in six months. One clump can produce 100 new shoots annually.

The rhizomes tolerate submersion in sea water and can break off and float in the currents to establish the grass at new sites. The leaves are up to 0.9 metres (2 ft 11 in) long and 6 mm (0.24 in) wide, with inrolled margins and sharply pointed apex. The cylindrical inflorescence is 7–22 centimetres (2.8–8.7 in) long, made up of numerous 10–16 millimetres (0.39–0.63 in) spikelets. It is adapted to habitat made up of shifting, accreting sand layers, as well as that composed of stabilised dunes.

== Life cycle/phenology ==
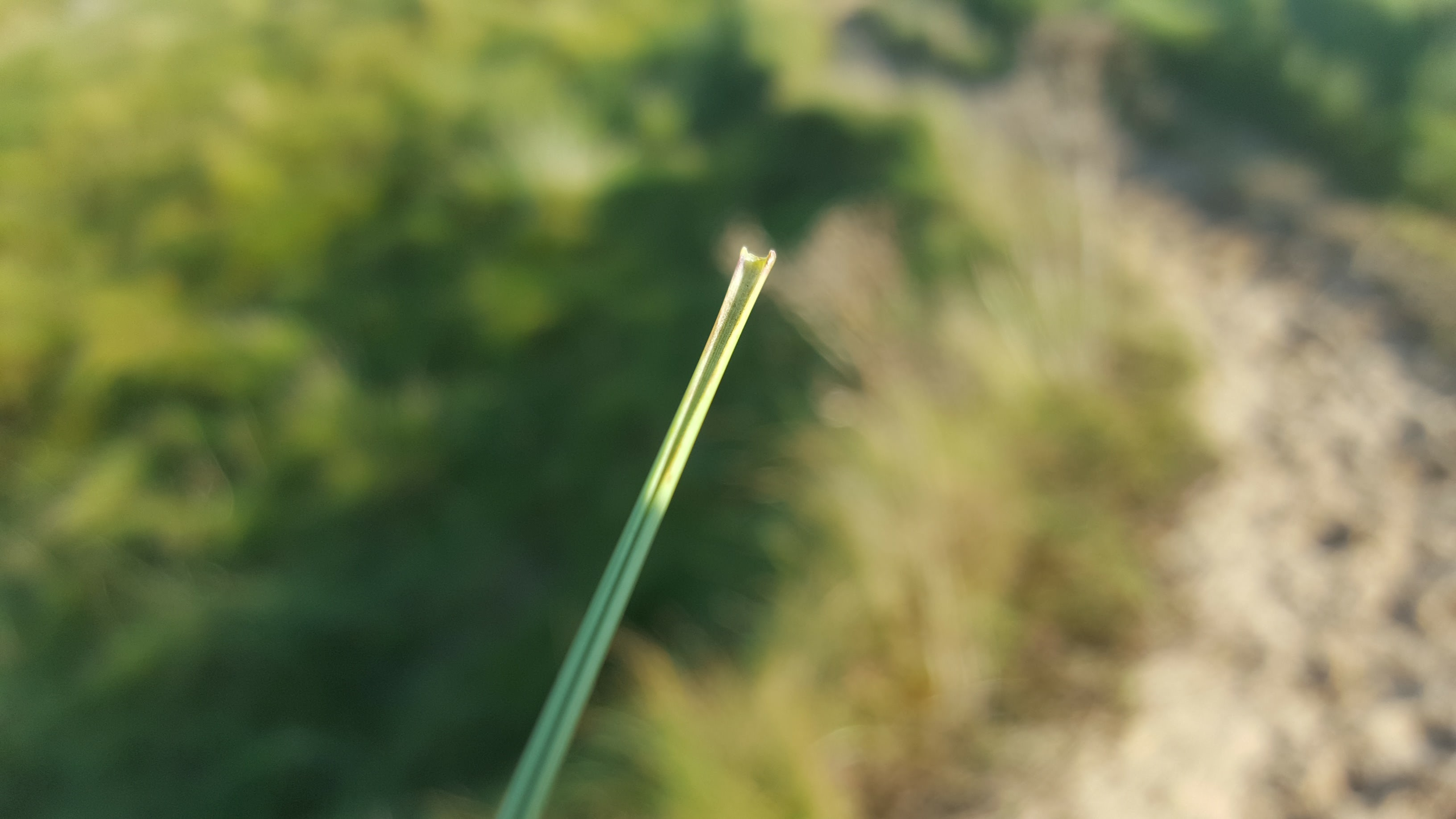
A single leaf of marram grass, showing the rolled leaf which reduces water loss

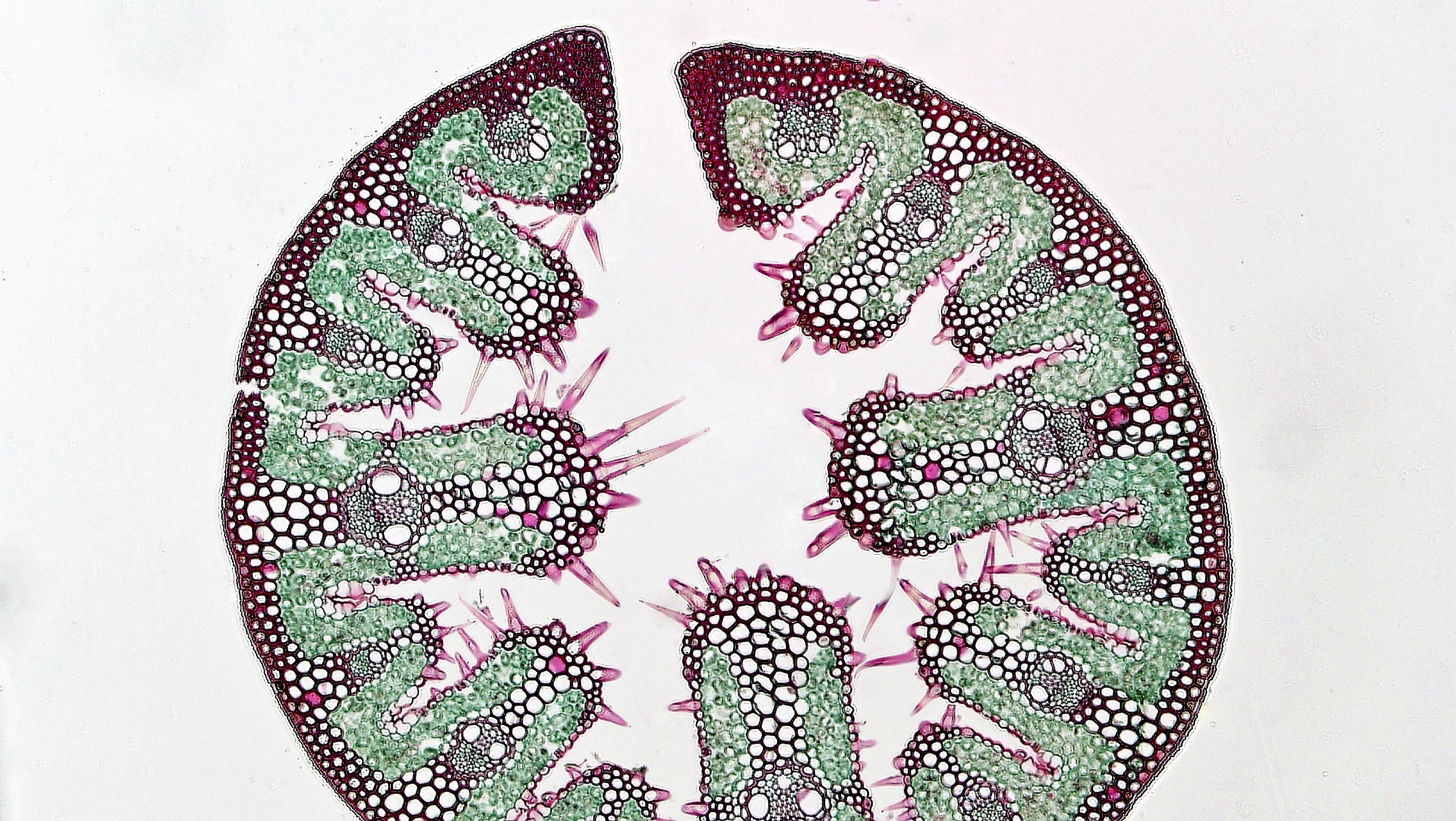
100x magnified cross section of a curled leaf

Ammophila arenaria is a perennial plant, which means it can live for many years. It mainly grows in spring when leaf production exceeds leaf senescence. However, the conditions in autumn cause the plant to nearly stop growth while its leaves become aged. In winter, because of the cold temperatures, growth is very slow but does not stop. As a xerophytic adaptation, its leaves curl during drought (see pictures). The relatively high humidity within the curled leaf prevents a rapid water loss. This is facilitated by the bulliform cells located at the base of the V-shaped notch which swells and makes the leaf uncurl when filled with water.

This plant is highly adaptive in sand, and can withstand burial for more than one year. Unlike other plants which will die in sand, marram grass will elongate its leaves when it is buried by sand.

Its inflorescences are initiated in autumn of the second year after germination and mature in May or June, and flowers are produced from May to August. The fruit is mature by September, and the seeds germinate the next spring. Though the adult plant is strong, the seeds have low viability, and the seedlings also have low survival rates as well because of desiccation, burial, and erosion. The main organ for its reproduction is rhizomes, which are dispersed along the shore by wind and water.

== Geographic distribution and habitat ==
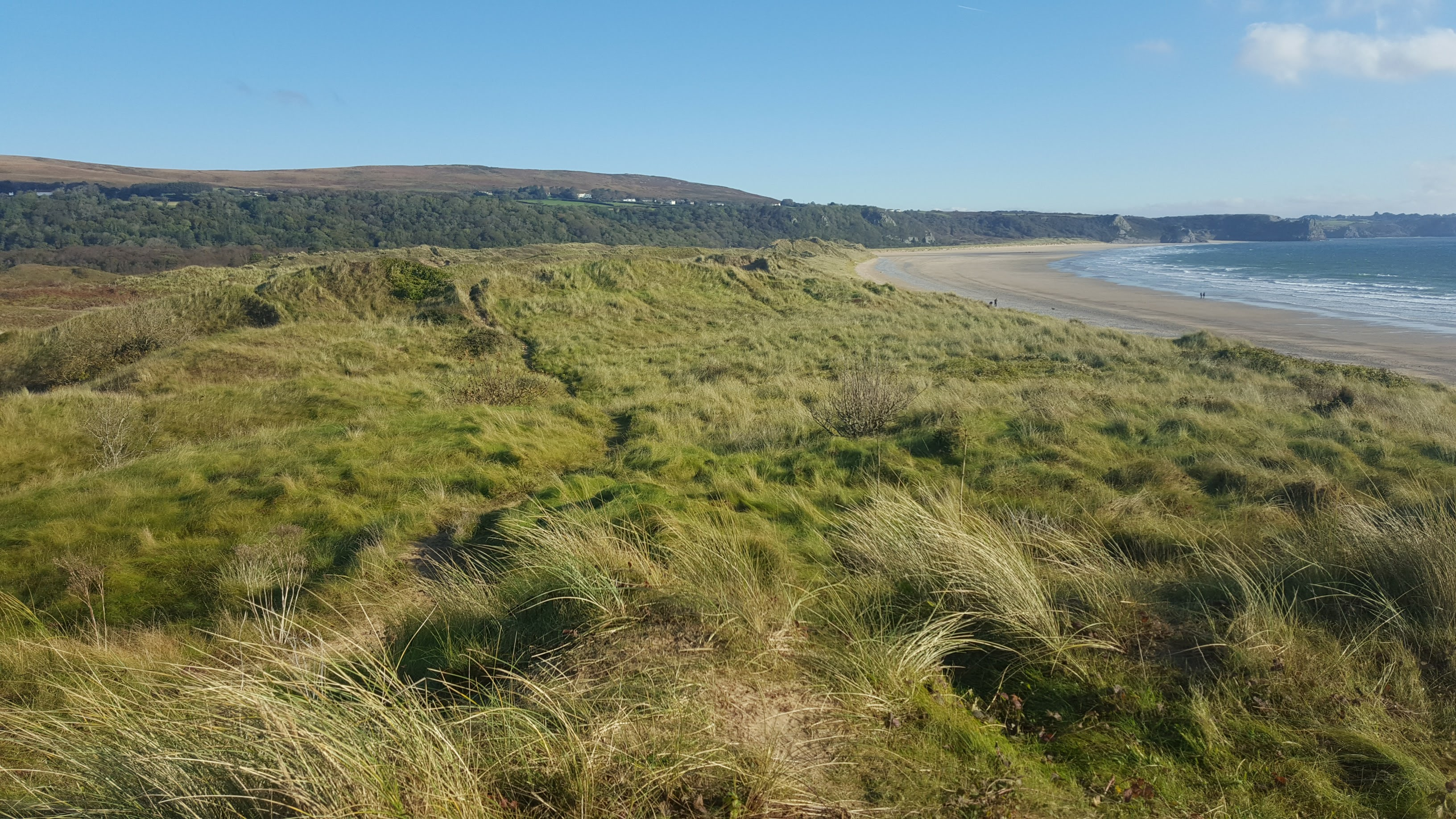
Sand dunes densely covered by marram grass at Oxwich Bay, Wales

=== Natural global range ===
Ammophila arenaria is native to the coasts of Europe and North Africa.

=== Non-native range ===
It is also introduced and naturalised in Australia, southern South America (Chile and Argentina), the Falkland Islands, New Zealand, South Africa, and the east and west coasts of Canada and the United States. In the Northern Hemisphere, it grows between 30 and 63 degrees north latitude.

=== New Zealand range ===
Usually occurs on sand dunes, sometimes in inland sites with low fertility. It occurs across the North and South Islands, and the Chatham Islands.

=== Habitat preferences ===
Marram grass grows on coastal sand dunes all over the world. It prefers growing on the active sand area and the windward side of the foredune. It prefers well-drained soils with different kinds of mineral compositions and low in organic matter. The optimal soil conditions for marram grass is a soil pH from 4.5 to 9.0, soil temperatures from 10–40 °C (50–104 °F), and salt concentrations of no more than 1.0–1.5%. Marram grass can also be found on alkaline soils with a high pH of around 9.1 and also acidic soils with pH less than 4.5. Adult plants can tolerate a large range of chemical issues. Marram grass has an ability to adapt dry sand well. Its leaves become rolled and tight when moisture levels are low.

=== Invasiveness: Pacific coast of North America ===
A. arenaria is one of the most problematic noxious weeds of coastal California, where it is called "European beachgrass". This sand-adapted grass was introduced to the beaches of western North America during the mid-19th century to stabilise shifting sand dunes. It grew readily, and it can now be found from California to British Columbia. The grass is invasive in the local ecosystems, forming dense monotypic stands that crowd out native vegetation, reduce species diversity of native arthropods, and cover vital open stretches of sand used for nesting by the threatened western snowy plover (Anarhynchus nivosus). The plant's spread has changed the topography of some California beach ecosystems, especially in sand dunes. The presence of this grass was a major cause of the destruction of native dune habitat in Oregon and Washington during the 20th century, where it was planted precisely for its dune-stabilising effect.

Several methods have been employed in attempts to eradicate the grass in California, including manual pulling, burning, mechanical removal followed by saltwater irrigation, and glyphosate application. Studies to find the best methods are ongoing; however, low-intensity treatments such as herbicides and manual pulling are being recommended by some researchers over mechanical treatments such as bulldozing due to potential negative impacts on endemic dune plants and dune geomorphology.

The California Conservation Corps has made major efforts in the removal of the invasive beachgrass, such as an initiative at Morro Strand State Beach in 2000.

=== Invasiveness: New Zealand and Australia ===
Not only is it invasive in California, it is also a highly invasive weed in coastal areas of New Zealand and Western Australia, where it was introduced for the same purpose in California, to stabilise dunes, outcompeting native Spinifex species. It is named in the Department of Conservation's 2024 list of environmental weeds. However, in New Zealand the larvae of the endemic moth species Agrotis innominata has adapted to using A. arenaria as one of its main host species. It has been suggested that prior to the removal of this invasive grass from the coasts of New Zealand, surveys be undertaken to establish whether this endemic moth is present in order to assist with the conservation of that species.

== Predators, parasites, and diseases ==
Marram grass does not carry any major disease in New Zealand, as only three pathogenic fungi (Claviceps purpurea, Uredo sp. and Colletotrichum graminicola) are present on the island. These three fungi result in ergot, rust and leaf spot, respectively, and are found both on flower-heads and leaves. However, in European countries, there are many pests known to feed on marram grass. Those pests can kill 30–40% of the tillers, and also damage other species. The fungi, always found in soil, may decrease vigour on stabilised sand.

== Uses ==
The roots of marram grass are edible, although thin and fibrous. The flowering stems and leaves are used for thatching, basketry and making brooms. Fibre from the stem is used for making paper, and the rhizomes are used for making rope and mats.

== See also ==
- Sea balls
