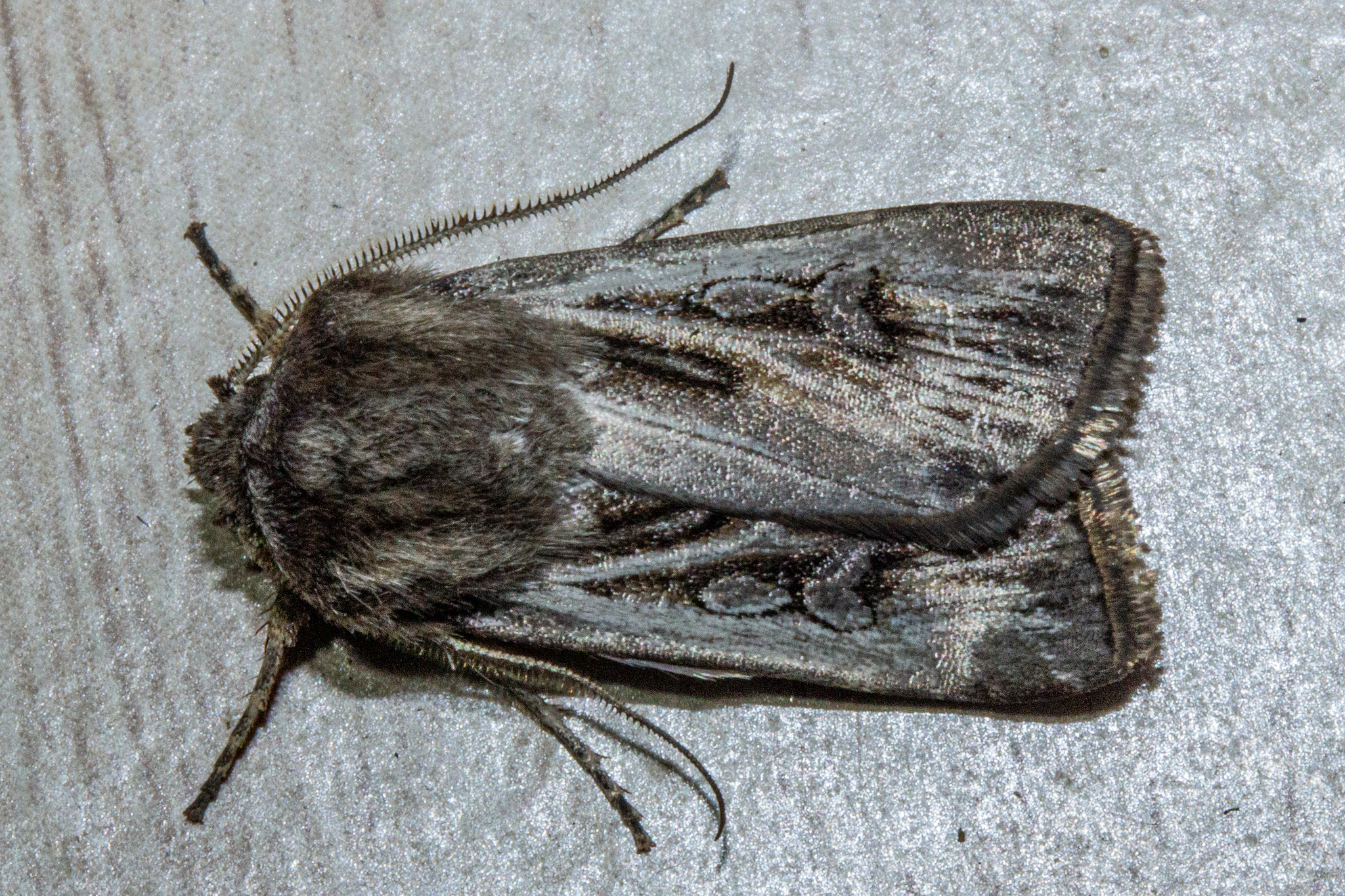
- Euxoa ceropachoides from Kaitorete Spit, Canterbury Region

Scientific classification
- Kingdom: Animalia
- Phylum: Arthropoda
- Clade: Pancrustacea
- Class: Insecta
- Order: Lepidoptera
- Superfamily: Noctuoidea
- Family: Noctuidae
- Genus: Euxoa
- Species: E. ceropachoides

Binomial name
- Euxoa ceropachoides (Guenée, 1868)

Synonyms
- Agrotis ceropachoides Guenée, 1868; Agrotis carapachoides; Euxoa cerapachoides (Guenée, 1868)

= Euxoa ceropachoides =

Species of moth

Euxoa ceropachoides, commonly known as Fereday's cutworm, is a species of moth in the family Noctuidae. It is endemic to New Zealand. It is classified as Not Threatened by the Department of Conservation.

== Taxonomy ==
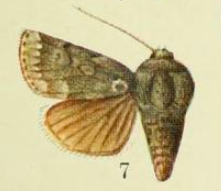
Illustration of holotype specimen

This species was first described by Achille Guenée in 1898 using specimens collected by Richard William Fereday at Rakaia in Canterbury and given the name Agrotis ceropachoides. George Hudson discussed this species under this name in his 1898 book New Zealand moths and butterflies (Macro-lepidoptera). However Hudson's illustration of the species in that volume is mistakenly labelled Agrotis carapachoides. In 1903 George Hampson placed this species within the genus Euxoa. Hudson followed this placement when he discussed and illustrated the species in his 1928 book The Butterflies and Moths of New Zealand. In 1988 John S. Dugdale, in his catalogue of all New Zealand Lepidoptera, also followed this placement but discussed the species under the name Euxoa cerapachoides, misspelling the species epithet. The appropriate genus for this species is still under debate as some experts disagree with Hampson's placement and believe the original genus is appropriate. However, at present, the name currently used to refer to this species is E. ceropachoides. The holotype specimen is held at the Natural History Museum, London.

== Description ==
The larvae of this species are brown-grey in colour with a broad lateral white band. They grow to a length of 35mm.

Guenée described this species as follows:

Superior wings somewhat dark grey, but entirely covered with long sulphur-coloured or greenish scales which obliterate all markings save the large black dots on the hinder margin; however, with attention, one is able to see traces of the reniform stigma, and it is possible that, in better marked individuals, the other markings would be visible; the fringe is long, grey, with the extremity white : the inferior wings are uniformly grey, with the fringes likewise long, whitish, divided by a dark line : beneath, all the wings are greenish-grey, powdered with black atoms on the costa; the superior have in addition, under the costa near the middle, a vague median cellular blotch, and a black dot at the base of the bristle. The thorax is broad, quadrate, darker grey than the wings, like the head, without any line. Palpi very hairy; the third joint thin, lost amid the hairs of the second. Antennae long, acute, and furnished with long ciliated laminae.

When describing this species, Guenée used a dull grey colour morph for the holotype and Hudson used the same morph for his illustration in 1898. E. ceropachoides is variable in colour and the dull grey colour morph makes up less than 10 percent of the males of the species. The variability in colour has led E. ceropachoids specimens to be confused with the species Agrotis innominata.

== Distribution ==
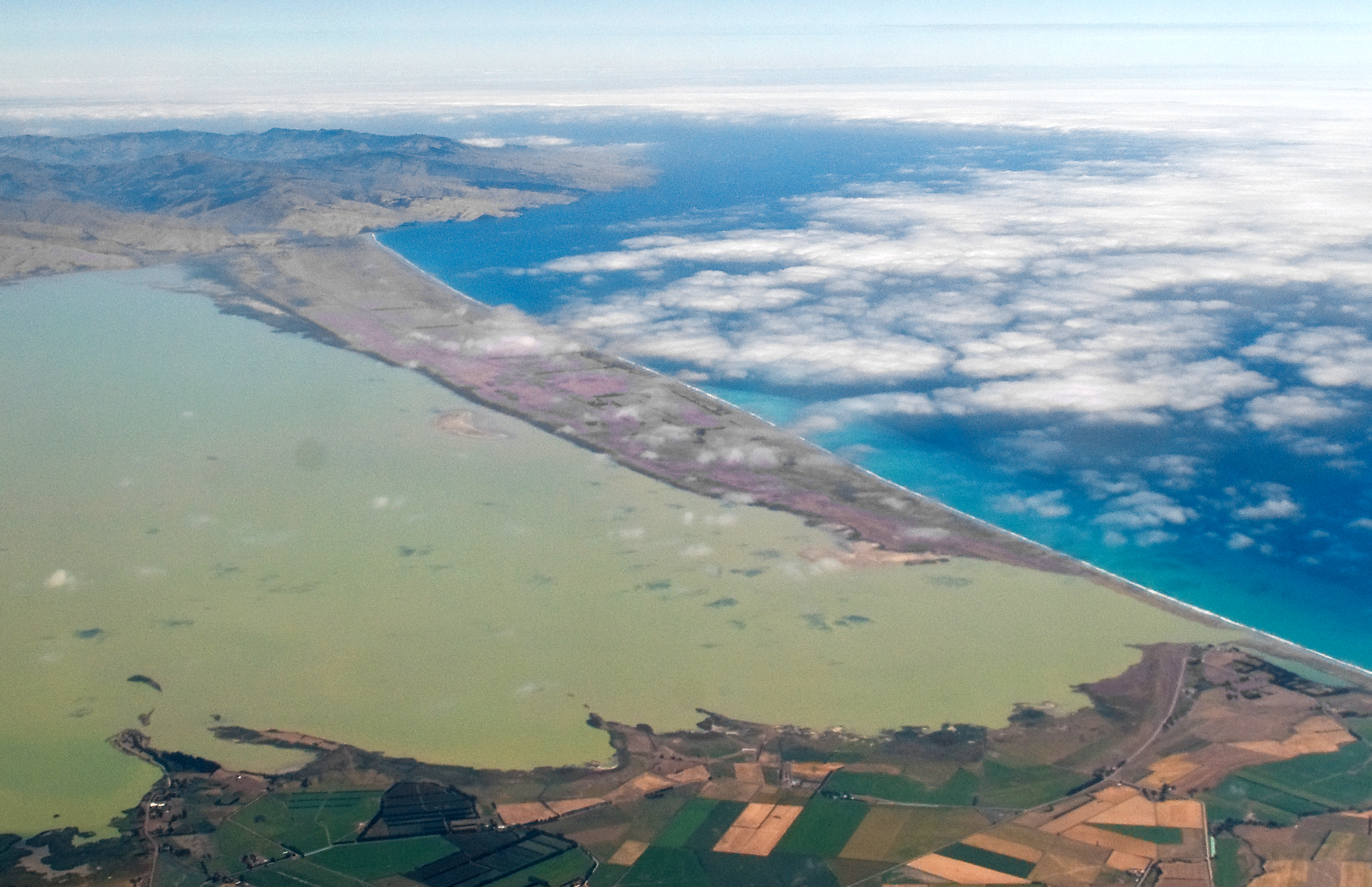
Euxoa ceropachoides has been found in central Canterbury Region in places such as Rakaia, and the Kaitorete Spit (pictured)

This species is endemic to New Zealand. It can be found in Canterbury and, other than its type locality of Rakaia, has also been found at Kaitorete Spit.

== Biology and behaviour ==
The larvae of this species are nocturnal and feed at night. During the day, they bury themselves in their sandy habitat. They also pupate in cocoons at a shallow depth in the sand. It has been hypothesised that the female of the species is short winged and flightless. This species is a winter to early spring emerging species and the males are on the wing from June to mid September. Adult male moths are attracted to light.

== Host species and habitat ==
The species prefers coastal sand dune habitat. The larvae of E. ceropachoides feed on both native and exotic grasses and herbs including Calystegia soldanella.

== Conservation status ==
In 2015 the threat classification of this species was considered and it was as having the "Not Threatened" conservation status under the New Zealand Threat Classification System.
