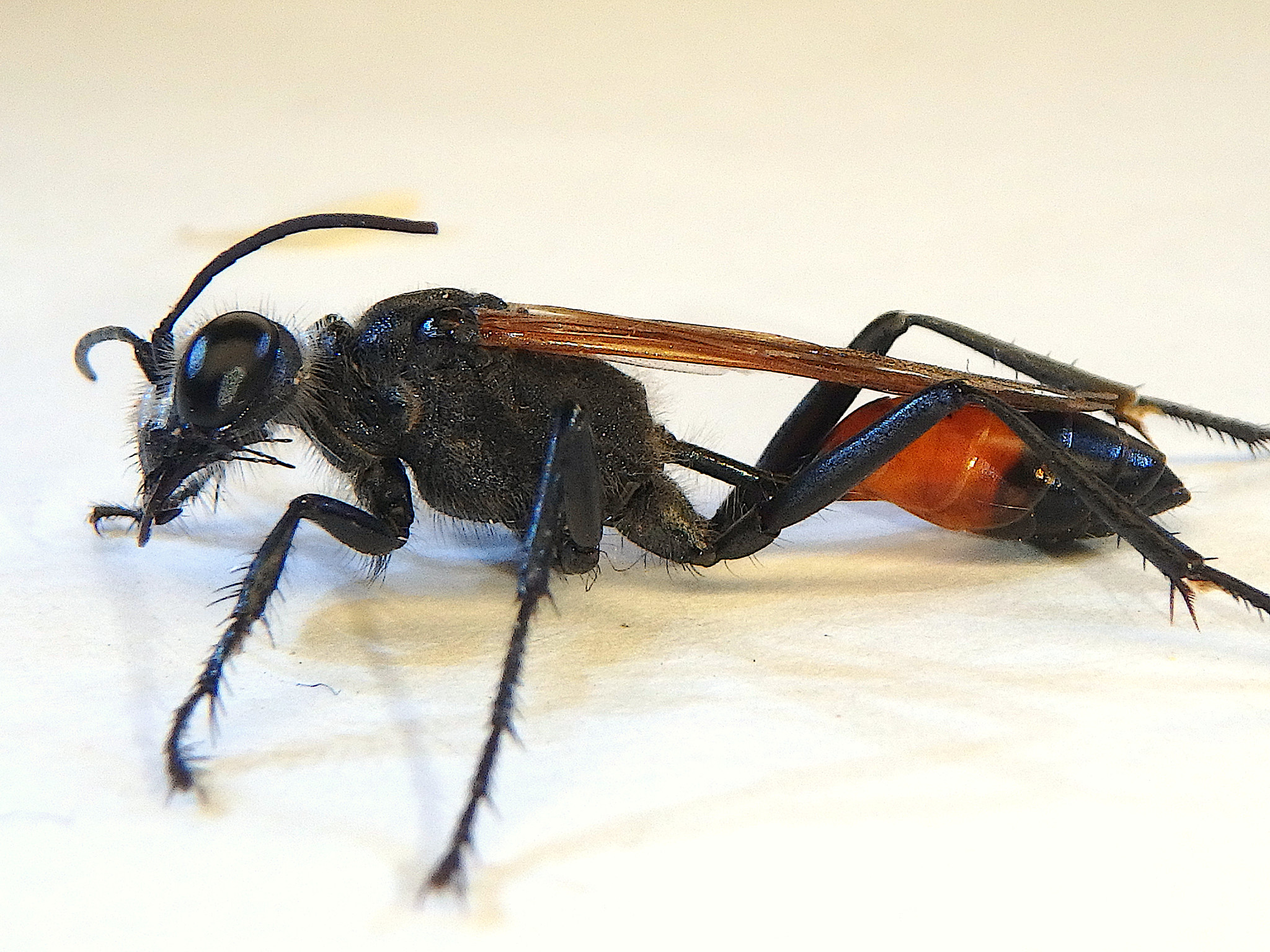

Scientific classification
- Kingdom: Animalia
- Phylum: Arthropoda
- Class: Insecta
- Order: Hymenoptera
- Family: Sphecidae
- Genus: Podalonia
- Species: P. tydei

Binomial name
- Podalonia tydei (Le Guillou, 1841)

Subspecies
- P. t. apakensis; P. t. argenata; P. t. senilis; P. t. suspiciosa

= Podalonia tydei =

Species of parasitoidal wasp

Podalonia tydei, commonly known as Tyde's sand wasp, is a species of sand wasp and thread-wasted wasp in the family Sphecidae. It is found throughout Australia, southern Europe, Asia, North Africa, and New Zealand, and frequent areas with exposed sand, especially coastal dunes. Adults are active at day during periods of strong sunlight, disappearing when it becomes overcast.

The subspecies P. t. suspiciosa occurs only in Australia and New Zealand.

== Description ==
=== Adult ===
Adult females grow to 22.2 mm in length, while males grow up to 17.5 mm. Head, mesosoma, legs, and distal half of the metasoma black, while the proximal half of the metasoma is described as being a "fulvous-red". Fine, silver-white hairs on the head, coxae, and metasoma. Mandibles large and long, dark red in colour, with three mesal molar teeth. Fore-tarsi with a rake of long, stiff bristles, and all legs are long and slender.

=== Larva ===
Larvae of P. tydei grow to 13.5 mm in length, and are slightly compressed dorsoventrally, tapered toward the head capsule. Head with a width of 1.34 mm, pale, with mandibles and three large teeth. Cocoon is a light brown.

== Biology ==
P. tydei wasps are known to often bask in the sunlight, on wood or on sand, and females are known to clean their appendages with combs on both the forelegs and hindlegs. To find Agrotis innominata larvae, the parasitised host for wasp eggs, females fly and walk over the ground to find likely spots to dig, creating numerous large craters.

In carrying larvae to the wasp's nest, the wasp straddles the prey, gripping it tightly with its mandibles.

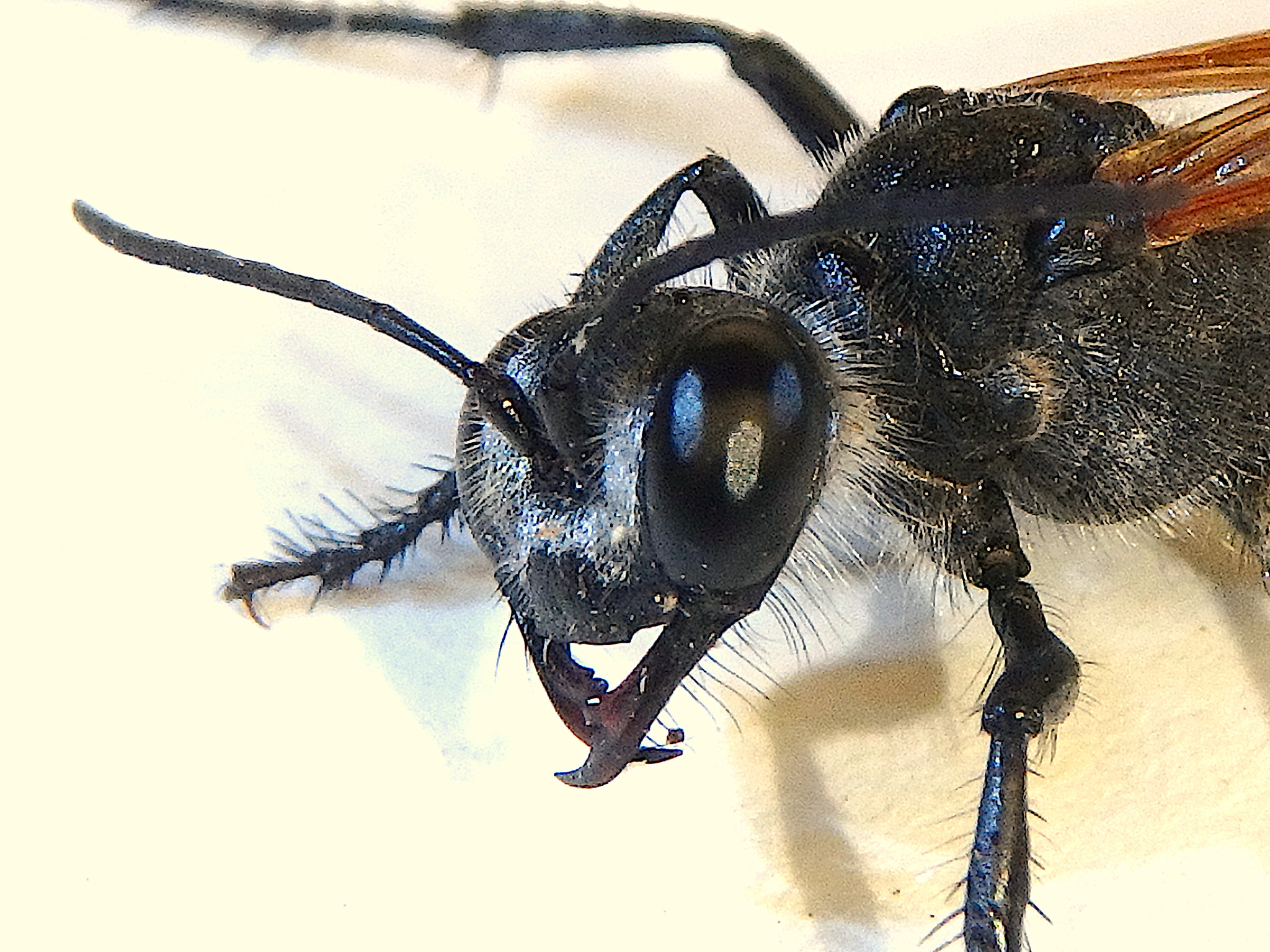
Close up of the head of P. tydei suspiciosa.

Nests are usually dug after collecting prey, and contain only one cell. Typically, they measure about 1.02 cm wide by 4.8 cm deep, and took the female on average 9 minutes to construct. 4-6 false burrows are too constructed around the main nest. One parasitised caterpillar is held in each nest, on which the eggs are laid. After laying of eggs, the burrow is then disguised and closed with sand and organic matter.

Mating occurs in March, where males will align on top of females, gripping her neck with his mandibles. The male then twists its abdomen around the female's, where copulation sometimes occurs.
