= Bulliform cell =

Plant cell type

Bulliform cells or motor cells are large, bubble-shaped epidermal cells that occur in groups on the upper surface of the leaves of many monocots. These cells are present on the upper surface of the leaf. They are generally present near the mid-vein portion of the leaf and are large, empty and colourless. They are proposed, though not confirmed, to be involved in folding and unfolding of leaf tissue in order to control light intensity and reduce overall water loss.

== History ==
The first discussion of bulliform cells occurred in 1909 in the revised and expanded version of the Plantesamfund (Oecology of Plants) written by botanist Eugenius Warming for an English audience. One of the features he investigated was the phenomenon of leaf rolling in the Poaceae and Cyperaceae families and how he noticed the bulliform cells, which he termed "hinge-cells", were on the epidermal layer of the leaf tissue, but deeper than the epidermal cells themselves and capable of folding distortion along with the leaf.

In the early 1990s, it was suggested by Fahn and Cutler that, at least in grasses, bulliform cells developed as a form of xerophytic adaptation. This was supported by evidence from decades earlier that showed that bulliform cells had larger development in species that lived in a desert ecosystem with a need to control water and salt levels.

== Mechanism ==
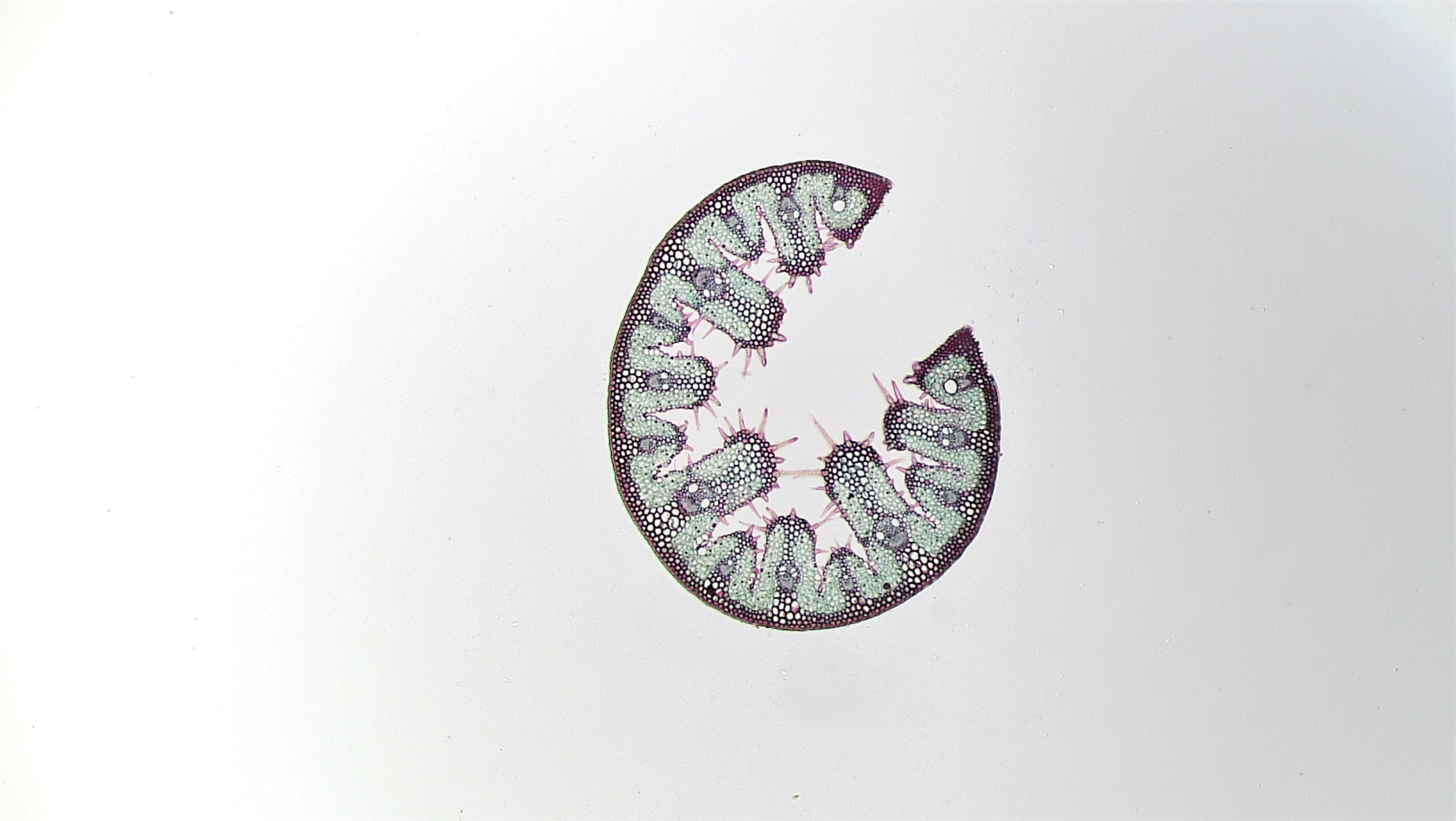
cross section of a curled leaf of Ammophila (plant) (40x magnified); white buliform cells are visible at the base of the grooves

During drought, the loss of water through vacuoles induces the reduced bulliform cells to allow the leaves of many grass species to close and the two edges of the grass blade fold toward each other. Once enough water is available, these cells enlarge and the leaves open again.

Folded leaves offer less exposure to sunlight, so they are heated less thus reducing evaporation and conserving the remaining water in the plant. Bulliform cells occur on the leaves of a wide variety of monocotyledon families but are probably best known in grasses.

It is unclear if this mechanism applies in all monocots, however, or whether other components such as fibers are the pieces controlling the folding and unfolding of the leaf. What is observed is that the turgidity of the bulliform cells often coincide with the folding activity, though there are cases where folding happens long after the cells have gone turgid.
