= Podalonia luctuosa =

Scientific classification
- Domain: Eukaryota
- Kingdom: Animalia
- Phylum: Arthropoda
- Class: Insecta
- Order: Hymenoptera
- Family: Sphecidae
- Genus: Podalonia
- Species: P. luctuosa

Binomial name
- Podalonia luctuosa (F. Smith, 1856)

Synonyms
- Ammophila luctuosa F. Smith, 1856; Psammophila pacifica Melander and Brues, 1902

Species of wasp

Podalonia luctuosa is a species of thread-waisted wasp in the family Sphecidae.
