= Podalonia argentifrons =

Scientific classification
- Domain: Eukaryota
- Kingdom: Animalia
- Phylum: Arthropoda
- Class: Insecta
- Order: Hymenoptera
- Family: Sphecidae
- Genus: Podalonia
- Species: P. argentifrons

Binomial name
- Podalonia argentifrons (Cresson, 1865)

Synonyms
- Ammophila argentifrons Cresson, 1865

Species of wasp

Podalonia argentifrons is a species of thread-waisted wasp in the family Sphecidae.
