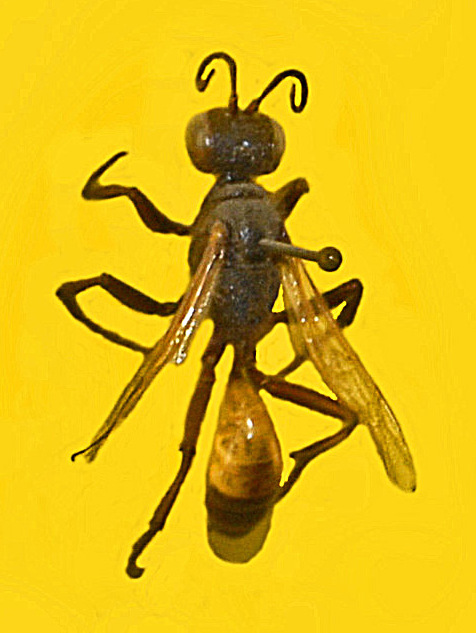
- Podalonia hirsuta . Museum specimen

Scientific classification
- Kingdom: Animalia
- Phylum: Arthropoda
- Clade: Pancrustacea
- Class: Insecta
- Order: Hymenoptera
- Family: Sphecidae
- Genus: Podalonia
- Species: P. hirsuta

Binomial name
- Podalonia hirsuta (Scopoli, 1763)

Synonyms
- Sphex hirsutus Scopoli, 1763; Sphex arenosa Gmelin, 1790; Sphex arenarius Fabricius, 1787; Ammophila mervensis Radoszkowski, 1887; Ammophila ebenina Lepeletier, 1845; Ammophila bolanica Nurse, 1903; Ammophila argentea Kirby, 1798

= Podalonia hirsuta =

Species of wasp

Podalonia hirsuta is a species of parasitoidal wasps in the family Sphecidae.

== Subspecies ==
- Podalonia hirsuta hirsuta (Scopoli, 1763)
- Podalonia hirsuta mervensis (Radoszkowski, 1887)

== Description ==
Podalonia hirsuta is similar to the sand wasps (Ammophila). It has a big black head, a black thorax, with a threadlike waist (petiole). The abdomen is black with a red-orange large band.

The females make their nests digging a burrow in a sandy area. The preys are generally large, hairless caterpillars of moths (Noctuidae). In the paralysed caterpillars they lay their eggs.

Flight period extends from late March to mid-September in females, while males fly from June to September.

== Distribution and habitat ==
This species is present in most of Europe. This mainly coastal species commonly can be found in sandy soils.
