= Podalonia luffii =

Scientific classification
- Domain: Eukaryota
- Kingdom: Animalia
- Phylum: Arthropoda
- Class: Insecta
- Order: Hymenoptera
- Family: Sphecidae
- Genus: Podalonia
- Species: P. luffii

Binomial name
- Podalonia luffii (Saunders, 1903)

Species of insect

Podalonia luffii is a species of insect belonging to the family Sphecidae.

It is native to Europe.
