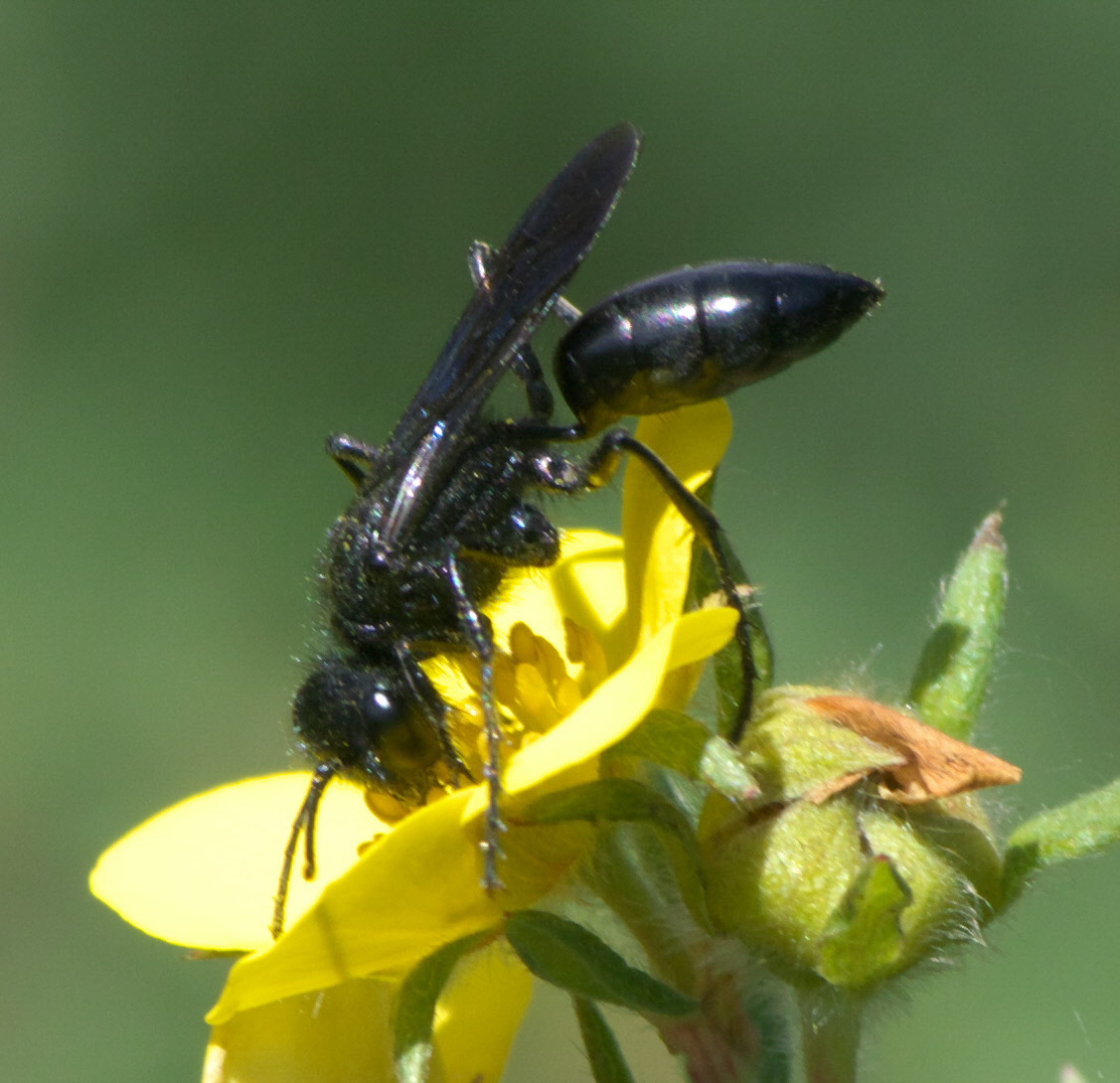
- Podalonia species

Scientific classification
- Kingdom: Animalia
- Phylum: Arthropoda
- Class: Insecta
- Order: Hymenoptera
- Family: Sphecidae
- Subfamily: Ammophilinae
- Genus: Podalonia; Fernald, 1927

Type species
- Podalonia violaceipennis (Lepeletier, 1845)

= Podalonia =

Genus of wasps

Podalonia is a genus of parasitoidal wasps in the family Sphecidae.

The genus is present worldwide with the exception of South America. These wasps are similar to the related sand wasp genus, Ammophila, but they have a much shorter petiole, and the abdomen is slightly stronger.

The females lay their nests in the sand. They normally incubate in large, hairless caterpillars of moths in the family Noctuidae.

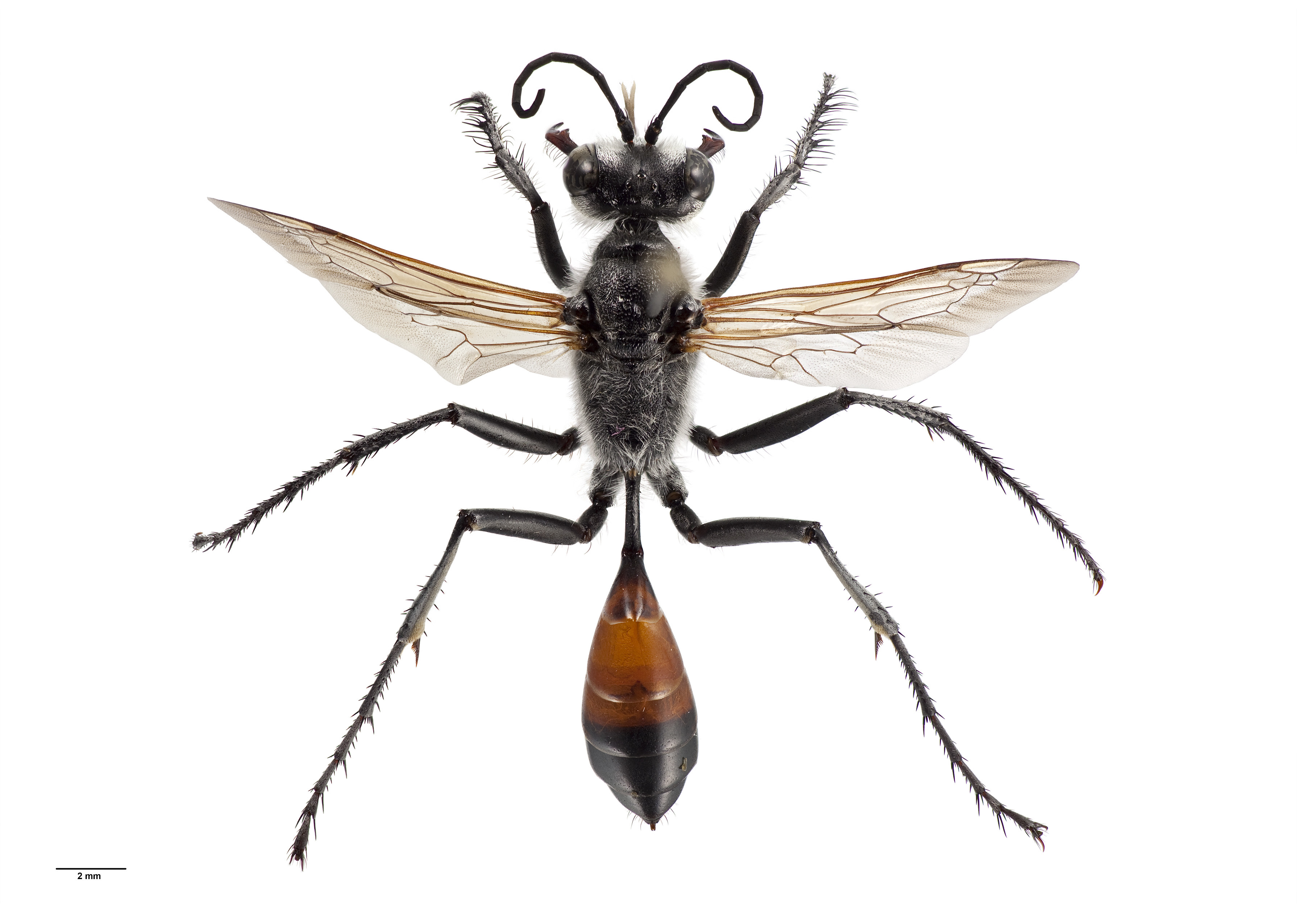
Podalonia tydei (Le Guillou, 1841)

== Species ==
This genus includes 67 described species:

- Podalonia affinis (W. Kirby, 1798)
- Podalonia afghanica Balthasar, 1957
- Podalonia albohirsuta (Tsuneki, 1971)
- Podalonia alpina (Kohl, 1888)
- Podalonia altaiensis (Tsuneki, 1971)
- Podalonia andrei (F. Morawitz, 1889)
- Podalonia arcuaticlypeata Wang & Ma, 2016
- Podalonia argentifrons (Cresson, 1865)
- Podalonia argentipilis (Provancher, 1887)
- Podalonia asiatica Danilov, 2017
- Podalonia aspera (Christ, 1791)
- Podalonia atriceps (F. Smith, 1856)
- Podalonia atrocyanea (Eversmann, 1849)
- Podalonia bicellularis Wang &d Ma, 2016
- Podalonia caerulea Murray, 1940
- Podalonia canescens (Dahlbom, 1843)
- Podalonia caucasica (Mocsáry, 1883)
- Podalonia chalybea (Kohl, 1906)
- Podalonia clypeata Murray, 1940
- Podalonia compacta Fernald, 1927
- Podalonia dispar (Taschenberg, 1869)
- Podalonia ebenina (Spinola, 1839)
- Podalonia erythropus (F. Smith, 1856)
- Podalonia fera (Lepeletier de Saint Fargeau, 1845)
- Podalonia flavida (Kohl, 1901)
- Podalonia gobiensis (Tsuneki, 1971)
- Podalonia gulussa (Morice, 1900)
- Podalonia gussakovskii Danilov, 2017
- Podalonia harveyi (de Beaumont, 1967)
- Podalonia hirsuta (Scopoli, 1763)
- Podalonia hirsutaffinis (Tsuneki, 1971)
- Podalonia hirticeps (Cameron, 1889)
- Podalonia kansuana Li & Yang, 1992
- Podalonia kaszabi (Tsuneki, 1971)
- Podalonia kazenasi Danilov, 2017
- Podalonia kozlovii (Kohl, 1906)
- Podalonia leleji Danilov & Mokrousov, 2016
- Podalonia luctuosa (F. Smith, 1856)
- Podalonia luffii (E. Saunders, 1903)
- Podalonia marismortui (Bytinski-Salz, 1955)
- Podalonia mauritanica (Mercet, 1906)
- Podalonia melaena Murray, 1940
- Podalonia mexicana (de Saussure, 1867)
- Podalonia mickeli Murray, 1940
- Podalonia minax (Kohl, 1901)
- Podalonia moczari (Tsuneki, 1971)
- Podalonia montana (Cameron, 1888)
- Podalonia nazarovae Danilov, 2017
- Podalonia nigrohirta (Kohl, 1888)
- Podalonia occidentalis Murray, 1940
- Podalonia parallela Murray, 1940
- Podalonia parvula Li & Yang, 1992
- Podalonia pilosa Li & Yang, 1995
- Podalonia pubescens Murray, 1940
- Podalonia pulawskii Dulfuss, 2010
- Podalonia puncta Murray, 1940
- Podalonia pungens (Kohl, 1901)
- Podalonia robusta (Cresson, 1865)
- Podalonia schmiedeknechti (Kohl, 1898)
- Podalonia sericea Murray, 1940
- Podalonia sheffieldi (R. Turner, 1918)
- Podalonia sonorensis (Cameron, 1888)
- Podalonia turcestanica Dalla Torre, 1897
- Podalonia tydei (Le Guillou, 1841)
- Podalonia valida (Cresson, 1865)
- Podalonia violaceipennis (Lepeletier de Saint Fargeau, 1845)
- Podalonia yunnana Li & Yang, 1992
