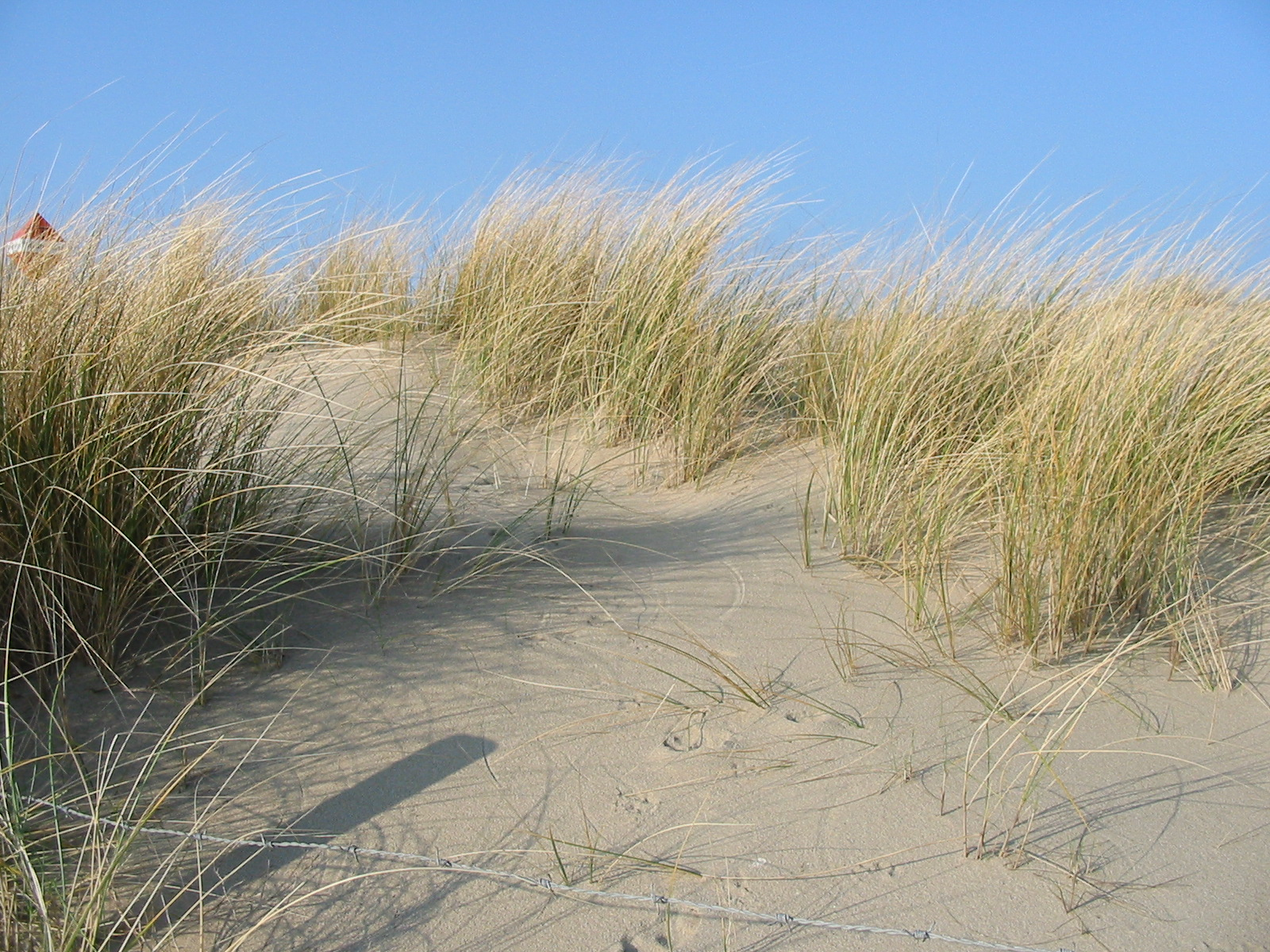
- European marram grass Dunes near The Hague, February 2005

Scientific classification
- Kingdom: Plantae
- Clade: Tracheophytes
- Clade: Angiosperms
- Clade: Monocots
- Clade: Commelinids
- Order: Poales
- Family: Poaceae
- Genus: Ammophila; Host

Species
- Ammophila arenaria (L.) Link; Ammophila breviligulata Fernald; A. champlainensis Seymour
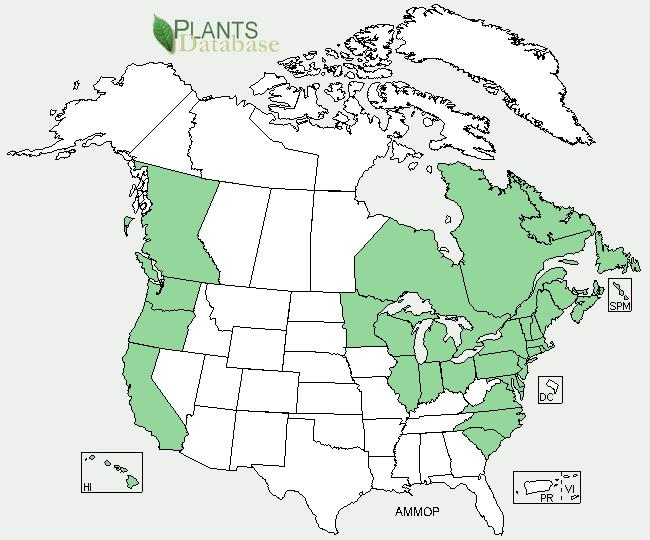
- The range of Ammophila in North America

= Ammophila (plant) =

Genus of flowering plants

Ammophila (synonymous with Psamma P. Beauv.) is a genus of flowering plants consisting of two or three very similar species of grasses. The genus name Ammophila originates from the Greek words ἄμμος (ámmos), meaning "sand", and φίλος (philos), meaning "friend". The common names for the grasses include marram grass, bent grass, and beachgrass. The grasses are found almost exclusively on the first line of coastal dunes. Their extensive system of creeping underground stems or rhizomes allows them to thrive under conditions of shifting sands and high winds, and helps stabilize the dunes and prevent coastal erosion.

Ammophila species are native to the coasts of the North Atlantic Ocean where they are usually the dominant species on dunes. Their native range includes few inland regions, with the Great Lakes of North America being the main exception.

The Ammophila grasses are widely known as examples of xerophytes, plants that can withstand dry conditions. Despite their occurrence on seacoasts, Ammophila grasses are not particularly tolerant of saline soils, although they can tolerate a salinity of about 15 g/L (1.5%), which makes them "moderate halophytes".

Ammophila builds coastal dunes and thus stabilizes the sand. For that reason, the plants are seen as a useful means of reinforcing dunes around the world and have been introduced far from their native range. Alfred Wiedemann writes that Ammophila arenaria, the European species, "has been introduced into virtually every British colonial settlement within its latitudinal tolerance range, including south-east and south-west Australia, New Zealand, South Africa, the Falkland Islands, and Norfolk Island, and has been reported from Argentina and Chile." Ammophila species were introduced in the late 19th century on the Pacific coast of North America as well, and massive, intentional plantings were continued at least through 1960.

In Oregon, the initial planting of European marram grass to stabilize sand dunes began in the early 20th century, with heavy implementation between 1910 and 1935. The resulting ecological impacts and habitat alterations have developed over several decades. Introduced to the Oregon coast for erosion control, it spread uncontrollably, replacing native vegetation and weakening natural storm protection.

In virtually all of the locations where it has been introduced, Ammophila is now listed as invasive. Ammophila infestations adversely affect coastal groundbirds and endemic dune plants, such as the western snowy plover, streaked horned lark (Eremophila alpestris strigata), and pink sand verbena (Abronia umbellata subsp. breviflora). In California, efforts to cull invasive Ammophila arenaria from Morro Strand State Beach began in 2000 and involved a combination of herbicide treatments and handpulling by a California Conservation Corps crew. That initiative produced a 60 percent mortality among the Ammophila after several months, but it was estimated that several additional rounds of treatment would be needed to fully remove the infestation, and the effort specifically focused on "relatively new infestations." Bulldozing has also been used as an effective mechanical treatment for Ammophila infestations in the Pacific Northwest, but research indicates that the intensity and frequency of bulldozing employed to remove Ammophila may also harm endemic dune plants and have negative impacts on dune geomorphology.

== Species ==
Only two species seem incontrovertible: A. arenaria and A. breviligulata. Two other species have been proposed, and are discussed below.

- A. arenaria - European marram grass or European beachgrass. Native to coasts of Europe (north to Iceland) and northwest Africa. Inflorescence to 25 cm long; broad.
- A. baltica - Purple marram. A. baltica has now been identified as a hybrid between A. arenaria and Calamagrostis epigejos. The hybrid occurs in parts of northern Europe, mainly from the Baltic Sea west to eastern England, and is known as × Ammocalamagrostis baltica or × Calammophila baltica.
- A. breviligulata - American marram grass or American beachgrass. Native to coasts of eastern North America, including the shores of the Great Lakes. Inflorescence to 30 cm long; narrower than A. arenaria.
- A. champlainensis or A. breviligulata ssp. champlainensis - Champlain beachgrass. Native to the shores of Lake Ontario and Lake Champlain. Inflorescence to 22 cm long; very similar to A. breviligulata, and no longer considered a distinct species by several authorities.

== Ecology ==
In Europe, Ammophila arenaria has a coastal distribution and is the dominant species on dunes where it is responsible for stabilizing and building the foredune by capturing blown sand and binding it together with the warp and weft of its tough, fibrous rhizome system. Marram grass is strongly associated with two coastal plant community types in the British National Vegetation Classification. In community SD6 (Mobile Dune) Ammophila is the dominant species. In the semi-fixed dunes (community SD7), where the quantity of blown sand is declining Ammophila becomes less competitive, and other species, notably Festuca rubra (red fescue) become prominent.

== Uses ==
The ability of marram grass to grow on and bind sand makes it a useful plant in the stabilization of coastal dunes and artificial defences on sandy coasts. That usefulness was recognized in the late 18th century. On the North Sea coast of Jutland, Denmark, marram grass was traditionally used for fuel, thatch, and cattle fodder after frost. Those uses led to sand drift and loss of arable land. Hence, legislation promoting dune stabilization came into force in 1779 and 1792, successively leading to a system of state-supported dune planters overlooked by dune bailiffs. Marram grass was – and still is – propagated by root and shoot cuttings dug up locally and planted into the naked sand in periods of relatively calm and moist weather.

Women from the village of Newborough, Anglesey, Wales, once used marram grass in the manufacture of mats, haystack covers and brushes for whitewashing.

Marram grass has been used for thatch in many areas close to the sea in the British Isles. The harvesting of marram grass for thatch was so widespread during the 17th century that it had the effect of destabilizing dunes, resulting in the burial of many villages, estates and farms. In 1695, the practice was banned by an Act of the Scottish Parliament:

Considering that many lands, meadowes and pasturages lying on sea coasts have been ruined and overspread in many places in this kingdom by sand driven from adjacent sand hills ... His Majesty does strictly prohibit and discharge the pulling of bent, broom or juniper off the sand hills for hereafter.

== Adaptations ==
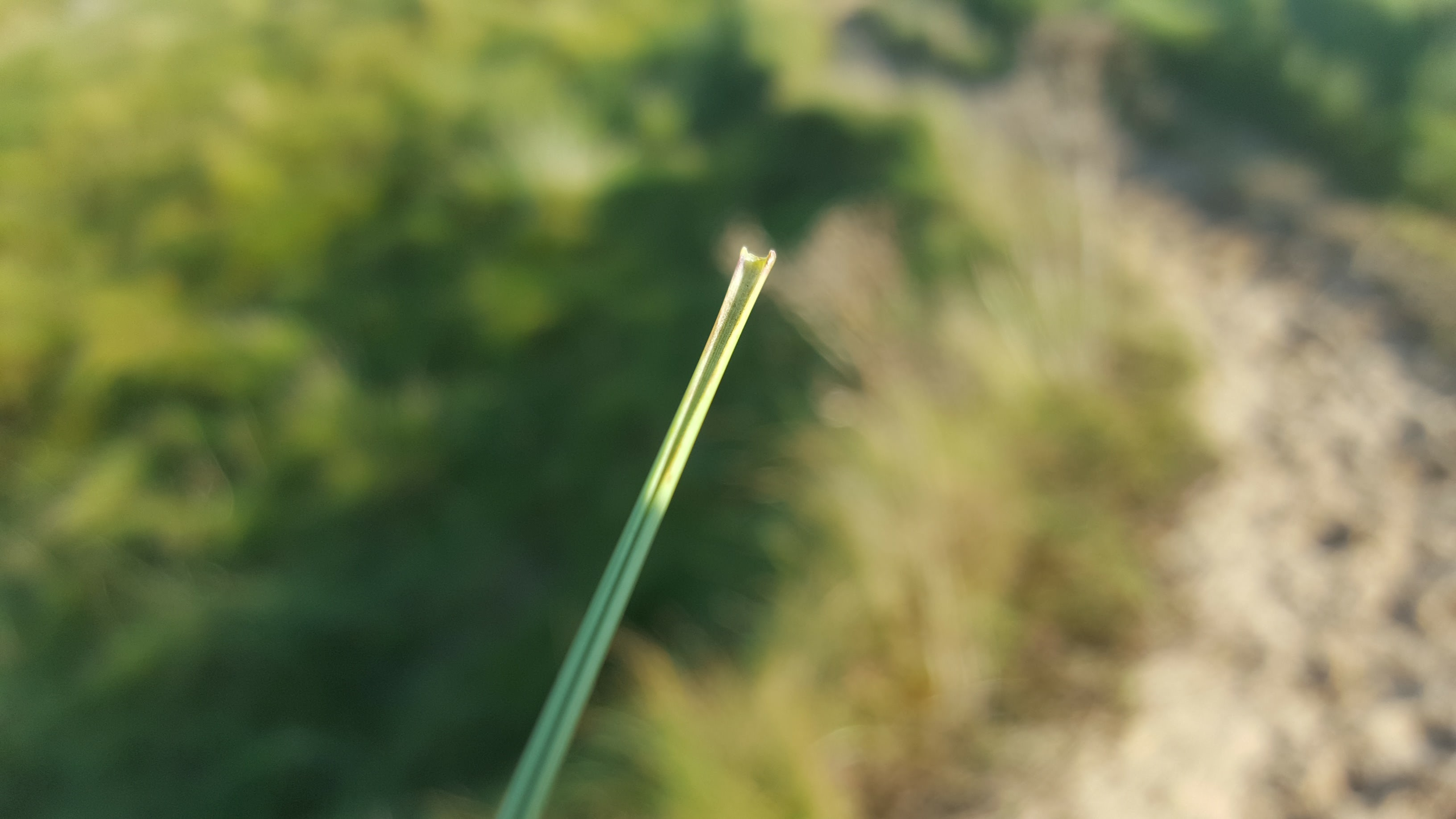
A single leaf of marram grass, showing the rolled leaf which reduces water loss

Like other xerophytes, marram grass is well-adapted to thrive in an otherwise harsh environment. The natural loss of water through transpiration is not desirable in a very dry landscape, and marram grass has developed particular adaptations to help it deal with that. Sandy conditions drain water quickly, and very windy conditions will further increase rates of transpiration.

Marram grass has a rolled leaf that creates a localized environment of water vapour concentration within the leaf and helps to prevent water loss. The stomata sit in small pits within the curls of the structure, which makes them less likely to open and lose water. The folded leaves have hairs on the inside to slow or stop air movement, much like many other xerophytes. Although they are typically found on the outside of the plant, in marram grass they are also within the leaf as this has now become a structure with more volume. The slowing of air movement also reduces the amount of water vapour being lost. A waxy cuticle on the leaf surface inhibits evaporation as well.

== See also ==
- List of Poaceae genera
