= Manuel Laínz =

Spanish botanist (1923–2024)

Manuel Lainz y Gallo (5 May 1923 – 20 July 2024) was a Spanish Roman Catholic priest, botanist, and entomologist.

== Early life ==
Laínz was born in Santander on 5 May 1923, into a wealthy family. He was baptized Manuel Sebastián Pío Laínz y Gallo. His father, Manuel Laínz y Ribalaygua (1891–1979), nicknamed "San Manuel" in reference to his great popularity, was an industrial and philanthropic entrepreneur. He was the owner of the tobacco brand “Jean” (Tabacos Jean) and the large Laínz department store. His grandfather, Manuel Laínz y Ruiz (1856–1945) was an hidalgo from Ajo, who would become mayor of Santander during the last year of the dictatorship of Miguel Primo de Rivera. His paternal ancestors were likely Austrian; thought to have arrived to the north of Spain during the times of Charles V, Holy Roman Emperor. Manuel Laínz was also a brother of Francisco Laínz, a member of Parliament under Adolfo Suárez.

== Career ==
On 26 September 1939, he entered the novitiate of the Society of Jesus in Palencia, and in 1941, he went to Salamanca, where he studied Humanities. In 1943, he moved to Carrión de los Condes and worked as a teacher. He studied Philosophy and Theology at the University of Comillas de Cantabria. He then returned to Comillas to study Natural Sciences. On 15 July 1953, he was ordained a priest in Comillas.

Between 1956 and 1978, he attended Labor University of Gijón, as a teacher and botanical researcher. During this time, he forged a friendship with Félix Rodríguez de la Fuente.

In 2004, the Society of Jesus ceded the work of Father Laínz to the City Council of Gijón: a library specialized in botany and an herbarium of 38,000 specimens; sheltering them in the Atlantic Botanical Garden.

Laínz died on 20 July 2024, at 101 years of age.

== Eponyms ==
23 species of plants are named in honor of Laínz:

- Adenocarpus lainzii (Castrov.) Castrov., Anales Jard. Bot. Madrid 57(1): 43 (1999).
- Alchemilla lainzii S.E.Fröhner, Anales Jard. Bot. Madrid 53(1): 25 (1995).
- Carex lainzii Luceño, E.Rico & Romero García, Anales Jard. Bot. Madrid 44(2): 429 (1987).
- Centaurea lainzii Fern.Casas, Exsicc. me distrib. 1: 9 (1975) (1975).
- Colymbada lainzii (Fern.Casas) Fern.Casas & Susanna, Fontqueria 2: 21 (1982): (1982).
- Fuirena lainzii Luceño & M.Alves, Anales Jard. Bot. Madrid 54(1): 415, 417, fig. (1996).
- Gastridium lainzii (Romero García) Romero Zarco, Acta Bot. Malac. 38: 225 (2013).
- Geranium lainzii Aedo, Anales Jard. Bot. Madrid 57(1): 162 (1999).
- Hieracium lainzii de Retz, Bull. Soc. Bot. France, Lett. Bot. 127(1): 81 (1980).
- Narcissus lainzii Barra & G.López, Anales Jard. Bot. Madrid 50(1): 123, nom. nov. (1992).
- Orobanche lainzii (Gómez Nav., R.Roselló, Peris, A.Valdés & Sanchis) Triano & A.Pujadas, Acta Bot. Malac. 37: 224 (2012).
- Phelipanche lainzii Gómez Nav., R.Roselló, Peris, A.Valdés & Sanchis, Flora Montiber. 50: 17 (15–29; figs., map) (2012).
- Rubus lainzii H.E.Weber, Anales Jard. Bot. Madrid 47(2): 333 (1990).
- Saxifraga × lainzii P.Vargas, Anales Jard. Bot. Madrid 54(1): 197 (1996).
- Sideritis × lainzii Obón & D.Rivera, Anales Jard. Bot. Madrid 54(1): 296 (1996).
- Solanecio lainzii Fern.Casas, Fontqueria 44: 140 (1996) (1996).
- Taraxacum lainzii Soest, Trab. Jard. Bot. Univ. Santiago de Comp. 7: 5 (1954).
- Thymus × lainzii Sánchez-Gómez, Fern.Jiménez & F.Sáez, Anales Jard. Bot. Madrid 54(1): 302 (1996).
- Tragopogon lainzii Suár.-Sant., P.S.Soltis, Soltis, C.Díaz & Blanca, Syst. Bot. 36(2): 478 (470–480; fig. 3, map) (2011).
- Valantia lainzii Devesa & Ortega Oliv., Bot. J. Linn. Soc. 143(3): 333 (2003) (2003).
- Vernonella lainzii (S.Ortiz) H.Rob. & Skvarla, Proc. Biol. Soc. Washington 123(3): 190 (2010).
- Vernonia lainzii S.Ortiz, Canad. J. Bot. 77(6): 877 (1999) (1999).
- Viola lainzii P. Monts., Anales Jard. Bot. Madrid 54(1): 237 (1996).

== Sources ==
- Lainz y Gallo, José María; Lainz y Gallo, Francisco (1990). Estudio Genealógico de la Casa de Lainz (1st ed.). Santander: Autor-Editor.
