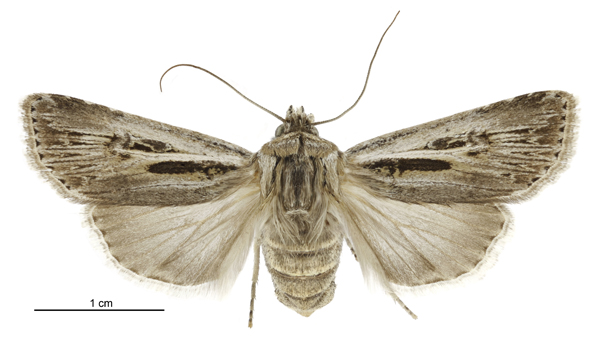
- Female
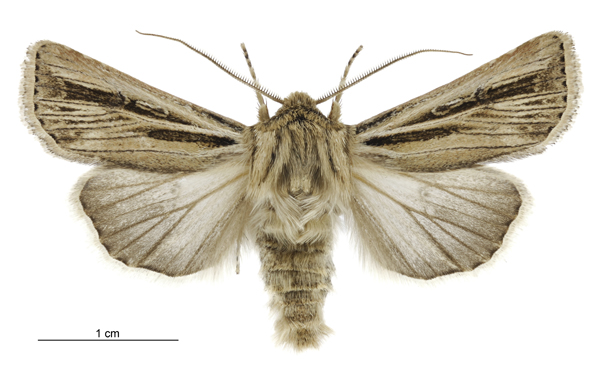
- Male

Scientific classification
- Kingdom: Animalia
- Phylum: Arthropoda
- Clade: Pancrustacea
- Class: Insecta
- Order: Lepidoptera
- Superfamily: Noctuoidea
- Family: Noctuidae
- Genus: Agrotis
- Species: A. innominata

Binomial name
- Agrotis innominata Hudson, 1898

= Agrotis innominata =

Species of moth

Agrotis innominata is a species of moth of the family Noctuidae. It is found in the coastal regions of New Zealand and is the only Agrotis species that is endemic to New Zealand.

== Taxonomy ==
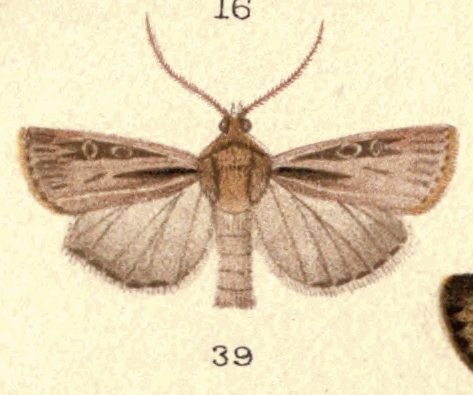
Agrotis innominata illustrated by George Vernon Hudson.

A. innominata was first described by George Hudson in 1898 using two specimens collected in Wellington, one by J.H. Lewis and the other by W.R. Morris. Hudson again described the species in his 1928 publication The butterflies and moths of New Zealand. According J. S. Dugdale the type specimen of this species cannot be found.

== Description ==
The caterpillar of the species is grey-brown in colour and grows to approximately 32mm in length.

Hudson described the adult male of the species as follows:

The expansion of the wings is 1 3/8 inches. The fore-wings are pale pinkish-yellow; there is a slender black longitudinal streak on the costa at the base, a broad black longitudinal streak at the base near the middle, and another a little beyond the base above the middle, containing the orbicular and reniform stigmata, these arc sharply outlined in pinkish-yellow; there are several rather indistinct black streaks between the veins, and a series of terminal black dots; the cilia are dull pinkish-yellow. The hind-wings are dull white; there is a series of brownish terminal dots, and the veins are marked in brown; the cilia are shining white. The head and thorax are pinkish-brown; the latter has two transverse black lines near the head, and two longitudinal black streaks on each side. The abdomen is dull white tipped with pale brown.

In the southern populations of this species the female is brachypterous. The adult male moth has a wingspan that ranges 36–39 mm where as the female of the species has a wingspan that ranges from 28 to 31 mm.

== Distribution ==
This species is endemic to New Zealand and has been found in the coastal regions of that country. It has been collected in its type locality of Wellington, as well as Whanganui and Dunedin. It has also been collected in Auckland, Tauranga, Tolaga Bay, Napier, Taupō, Paiaka, Milford Sound, Westport, Haast, Kaitorete Spit, Portobello and in the Catlins.

== Habitat ==
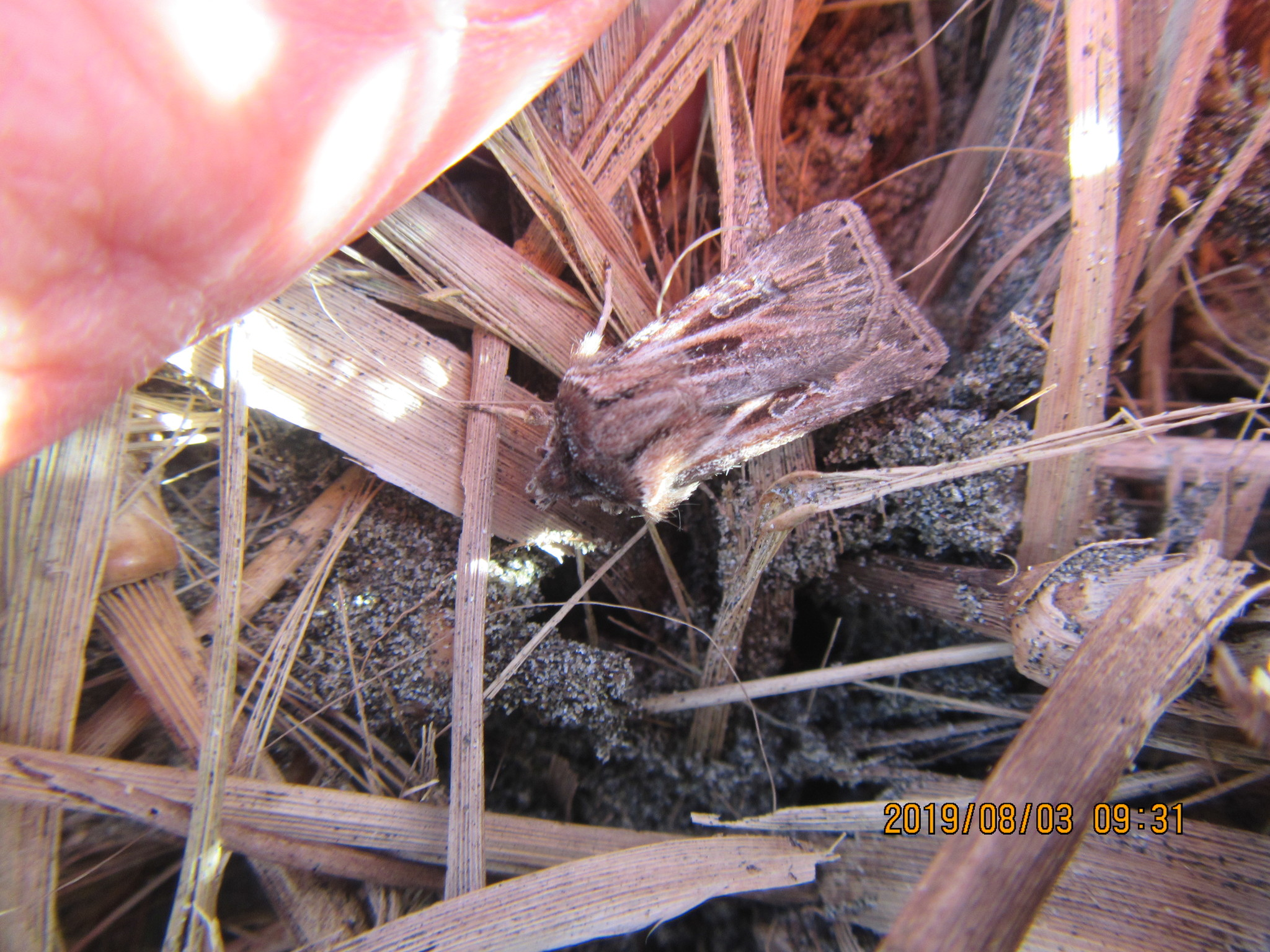
Agrotis innominata in its coastal habitat

The preferred habitat of A. innominata is coastal sand dunes where the larvae of the species is able to feed on its host species and can pupate in the sand.

== Hosts ==
The larvae feed on Ammophila arenaria (also known as marram grass), Acaena novae-zelandiae and Calystegia soldanella. Larvae also appeared to feed on Craspedia species at Kaitorete Spit. The indigenous species Calystegia soldanella has been hypothesised as this species main original host.

== Behaviour ==
The larvae of the species burrow into the sand near their host plants. They have been found from in depths of between 1– 5 cm. It has been hypothesised that the larvae are nocturnal, coming out at night to feed on the stems and leaves of their hosts. The emergence pattern of adult moths of this species is regarded as being unusual. They begin to emerge in the late autumn and continue in small numbers throughout the winter months. Their peak emergence is between August and December. The adults of the species are therefore on the wing from May to December.

== Conservation ==
Although marram grass is now generally considered to be an invasive species in New Zealand it is now one of the main host plants of this endemic moth. It has been suggested that prior to removal of this invasive grass a survey for the presence of A. innominata be conducted. This regarded as especially important in more southerly coastal regions as the brachypterous nature of the females of this moth hinders the spread of populations.
