= Morro Strand State Beach =

State park in California, United States

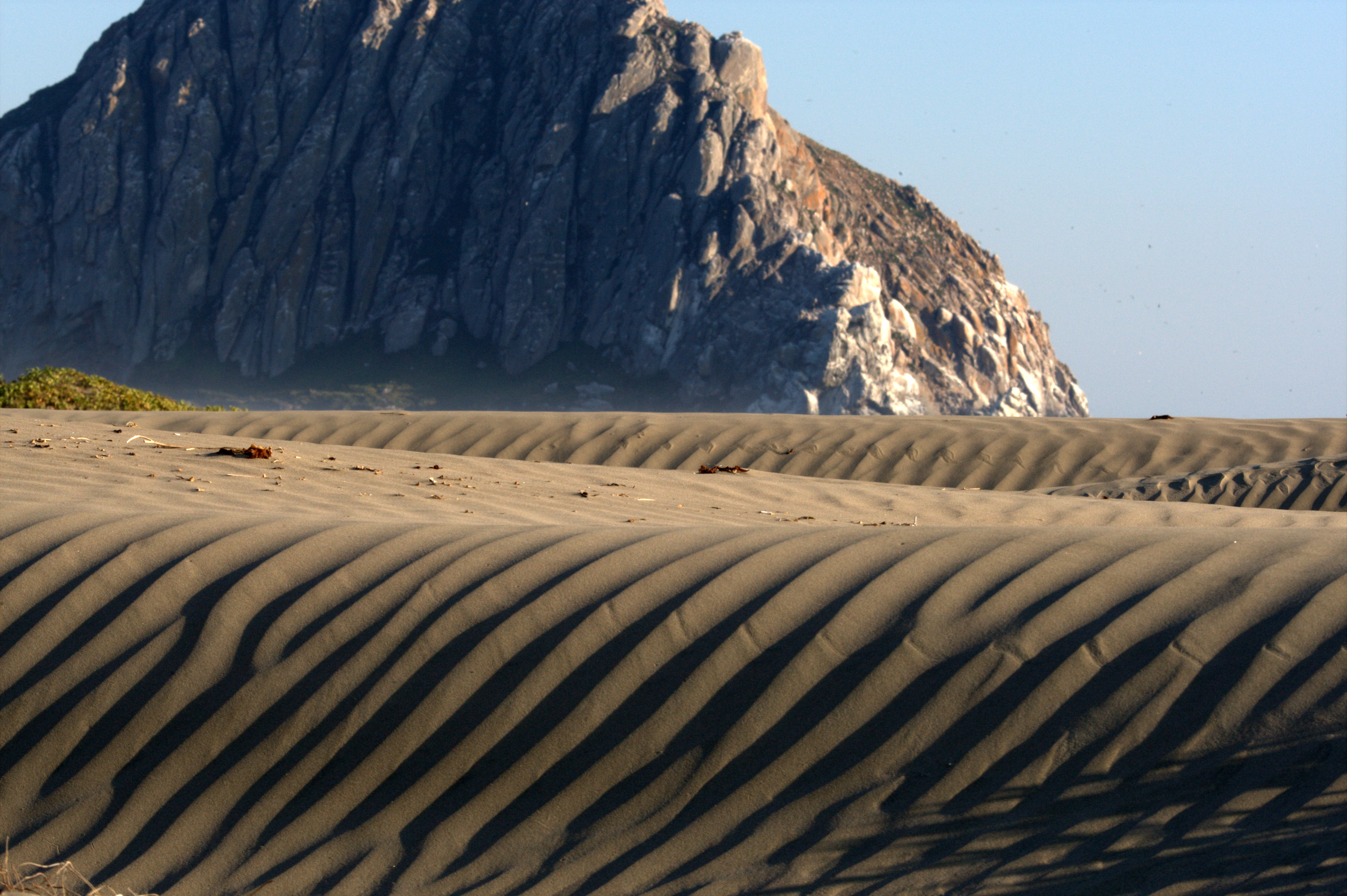

- Location within California Location within the United States
- Location: San Luis Obispo County, California
- Nearest city: Morro Bay
- Coordinates: 35°22′33″N 120°51′47″W
- Governing body: California Department of Parks and Recreation

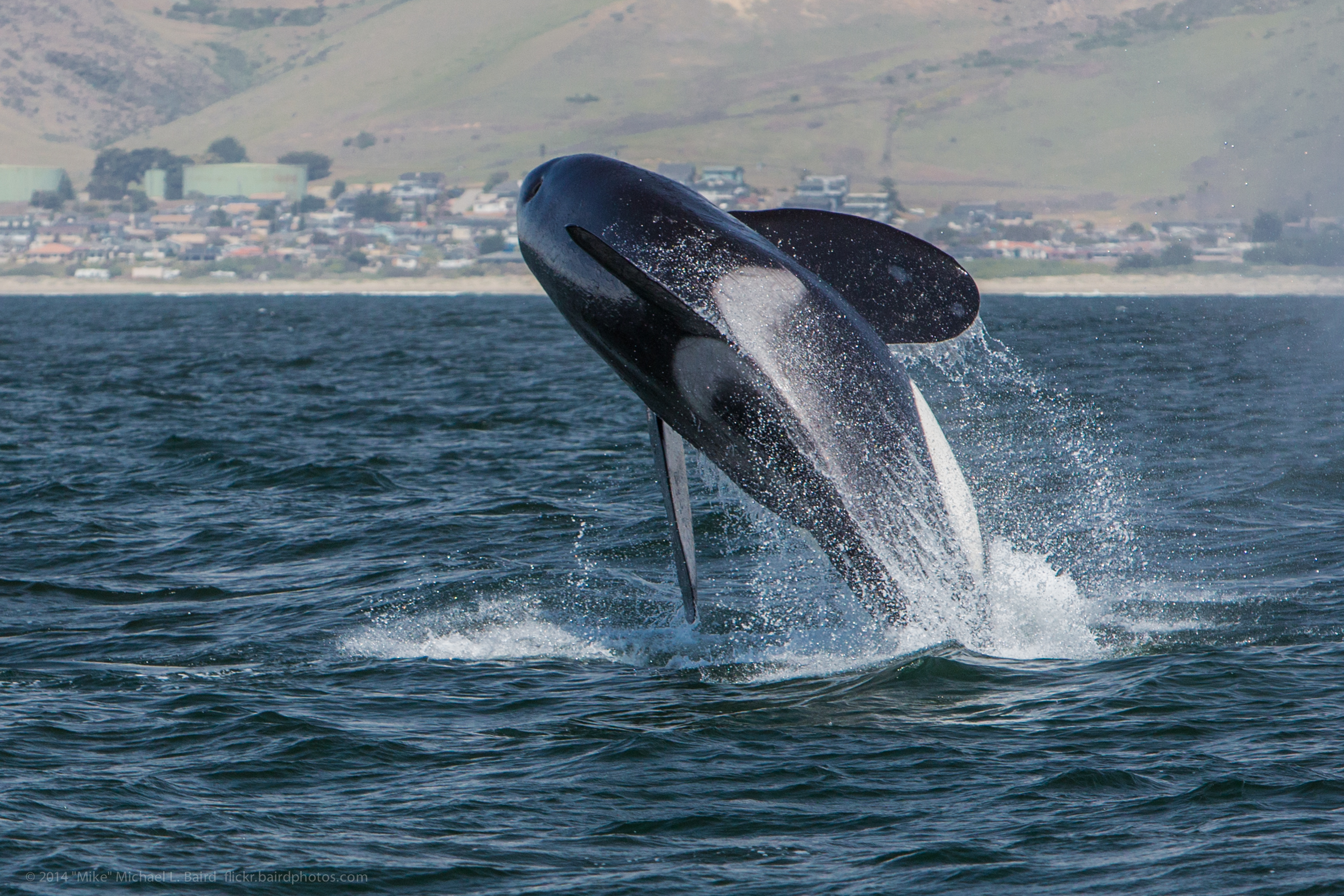
Orca breaching, just offshore from Morro Strand, May 8, 2014. North Morro Bay town in background

Morro Strand State Beach (formerly Atascadero State Beach) is a protected beach within California's state park system located in north Morro Bay along California State Route 1. Morro Strand is a popular coastal frontage park on Estero Bay featuring the Morro Strand Trail and picnic sites. A three-mile stretch of beach connects the southern and northern entrances to the beach. Dogs are prohibited in part due to the nesting and protection of the Western Snowy Plover. Fishing, surfing, beach walking, and jogging are popular activities.

== Proposed for closure ==
Morro Strands State Beach was one of the 48 California state parks proposed for closure in January 2008 by California's Governor Arnold Schwarzenegger as part of a deficit reduction program.

== Marine Protected Areas ==
Morro Bay State Marine Recreational Management Area and Morro Bay State Marine Reserve are marine protected areas within Morro Bay. Like underwater parks, these marine protected areas help conserve ocean wildlife and marine ecosystems.

== See also ==
- Morro Rock
- List of beaches in California
- List of California state parks
