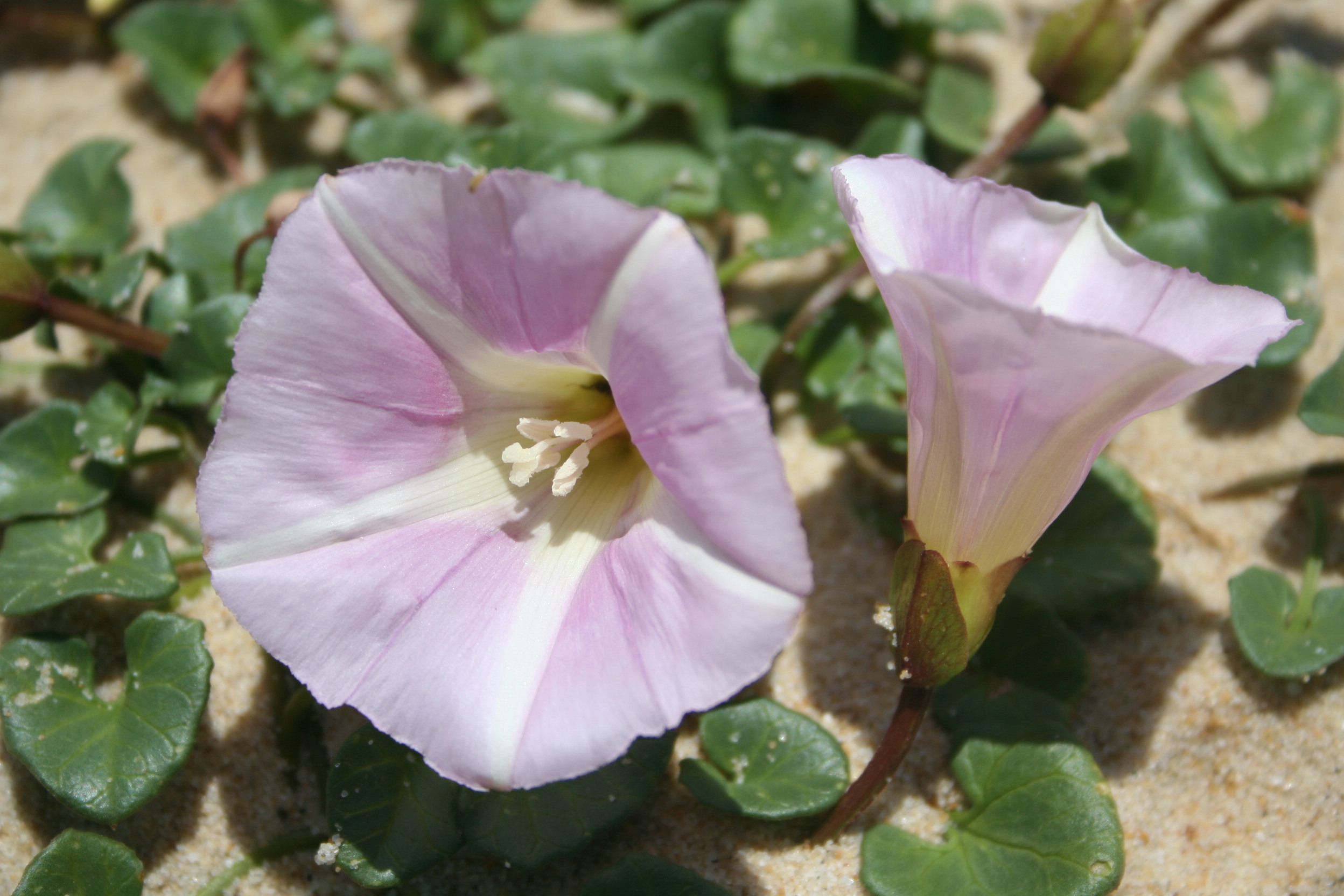

Scientific classification
- Kingdom: Plantae
- Clade: Tracheophytes
- Clade: Angiosperms
- Clade: Eudicots
- Clade: Asterids
- Order: Solanales
- Family: Convolvulaceae
- Genus: Convolvulus
- Species: C. soldanella

Binomial name
- Convolvulus soldanella L.

Synonyms
- Calystegia soldanella (L.) Roem. & Schult.; Calystegia soldanella var. australis Endl.; Convolvulus asarifolius Salisb.; Convolvulus sepium var. soldanella (L.) C.Moore; Latrienda soldanella (L.) Raf.; Volvulus soldanella (L.) Junger

= Convolvulus soldanella =

Species of morning glory

Convolvulus soldanella (syn. Convolvulus soldanella) is a species of bindweed known by various common names such as sea bells, sea bindweed, seashore false bindweed, shore bindweed, shore convolvulus and beach morning glory.

== Description ==
It is a perennial vine which grows in beach sand and other coastal habitats in temperate regions across the world. It is also known as 'The Prince's Flower' after Prince Charles Edward Stuart who sowed it on the Island of Eriskay, Scotland, when he landed there in 1745 to lead the Jacobite rising.

The plant bears trailing, fleshy stems, kidney-shaped leaves, and creamy-white flower buds and attractive morning glory-like flowers with corollas delicate pink to vivid lavender. They are insect-pollinated.

== Distribution ==
In North America Convolvulus soldanella is found on the west coast and selected areas of the east coast. In the United Kingdom it is widespread on the sandy coasts of England and Wales, less common in Scotland and Northern Ireland. It is also widespread around the coast of Ireland, the Isle of Man, and Mediterranean coast.

In the southern hemisphere Convolvulus soldanella can be found in coastal areas of Australia, New Zealand, southern South America and South Africa. In 1973, botanical illustrator Nancy Adams collected this species on the south coast of Wellington, New Zealand and it was still abundant there 51 years later.
